= 2012 in architecture =

The year 2012 in architecture involved some significant architectural events and new buildings.

== Events ==
- April 30 – 1 WTC surpasses the height of the Empire State Building to become the tallest building in New York City.
- July – Mausoleums and a mosque in Timbuktu (Mali) are deliberately attacked by rebels, a war crime for which Ahmad al-Mahdi in 2016 pleads guilty before the International Criminal Court.
- July 20 – A fire at the newly-opened Heydar Aliyev Center in Baku, Azerbaijan, leads to its closure for more than a year.
- October
  - The fifth World Architecture Festival is held in Singapore.
  - Second hurricane survival of 1 WTC.
  - It is announced that the Opera House, Wellington, is below 34% of the earthquake code and may have to close for strengthening work to be carried out.
- November – The Japanese government announces plans for a new National Olympic Stadium (Tokyo) for the 2020 Summer Olympics based on a design by Zaha Hadid; these will be abandoned in 2015.
- December 11 – 1 WTC's spire comes to New York City.
- Assemble (collective) begins working in Granby Four Streets, Liverpool.

== Buildings and structures ==
=== Buildings opened ===
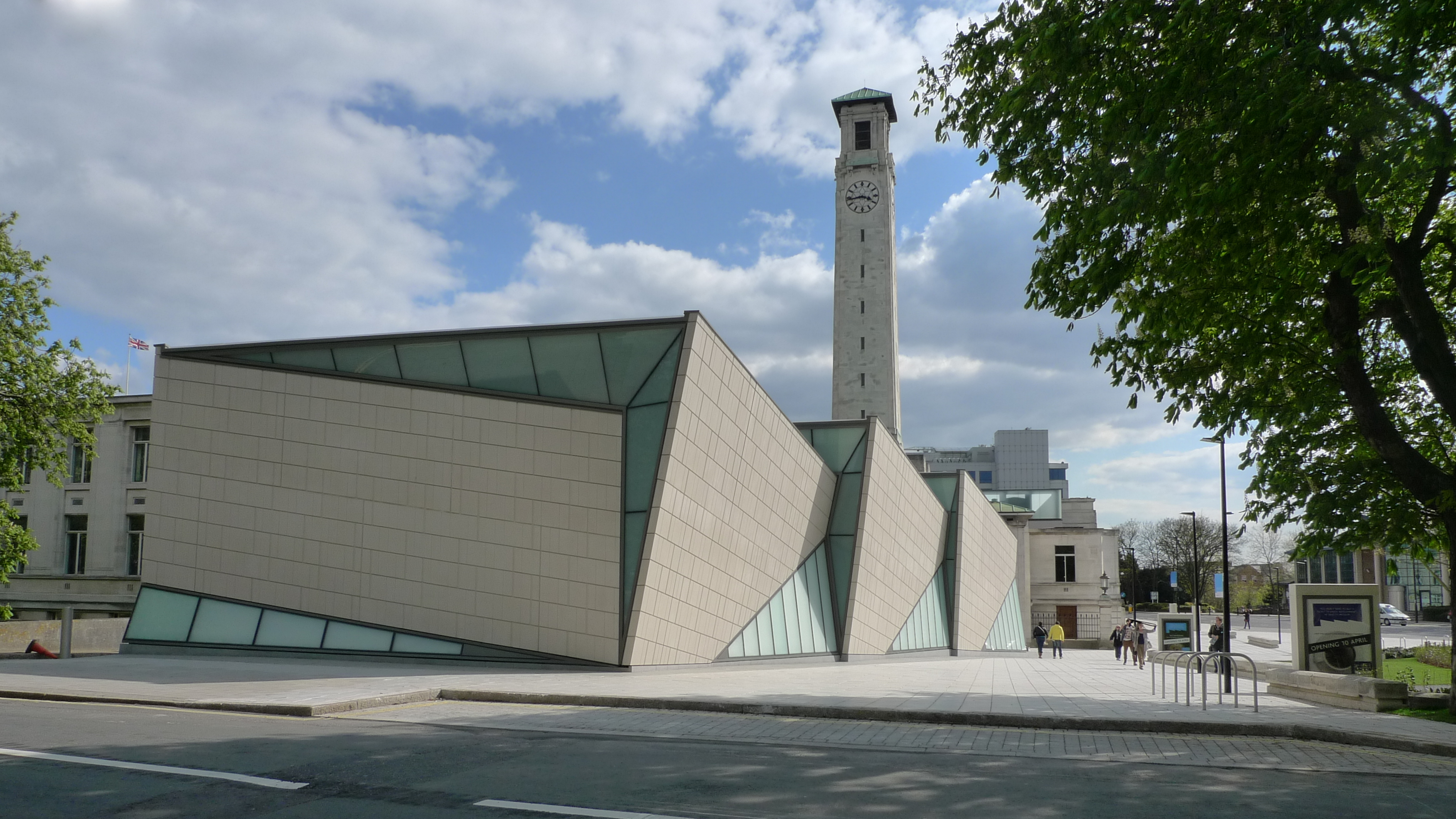
SeaCity Museum in Southampton, England

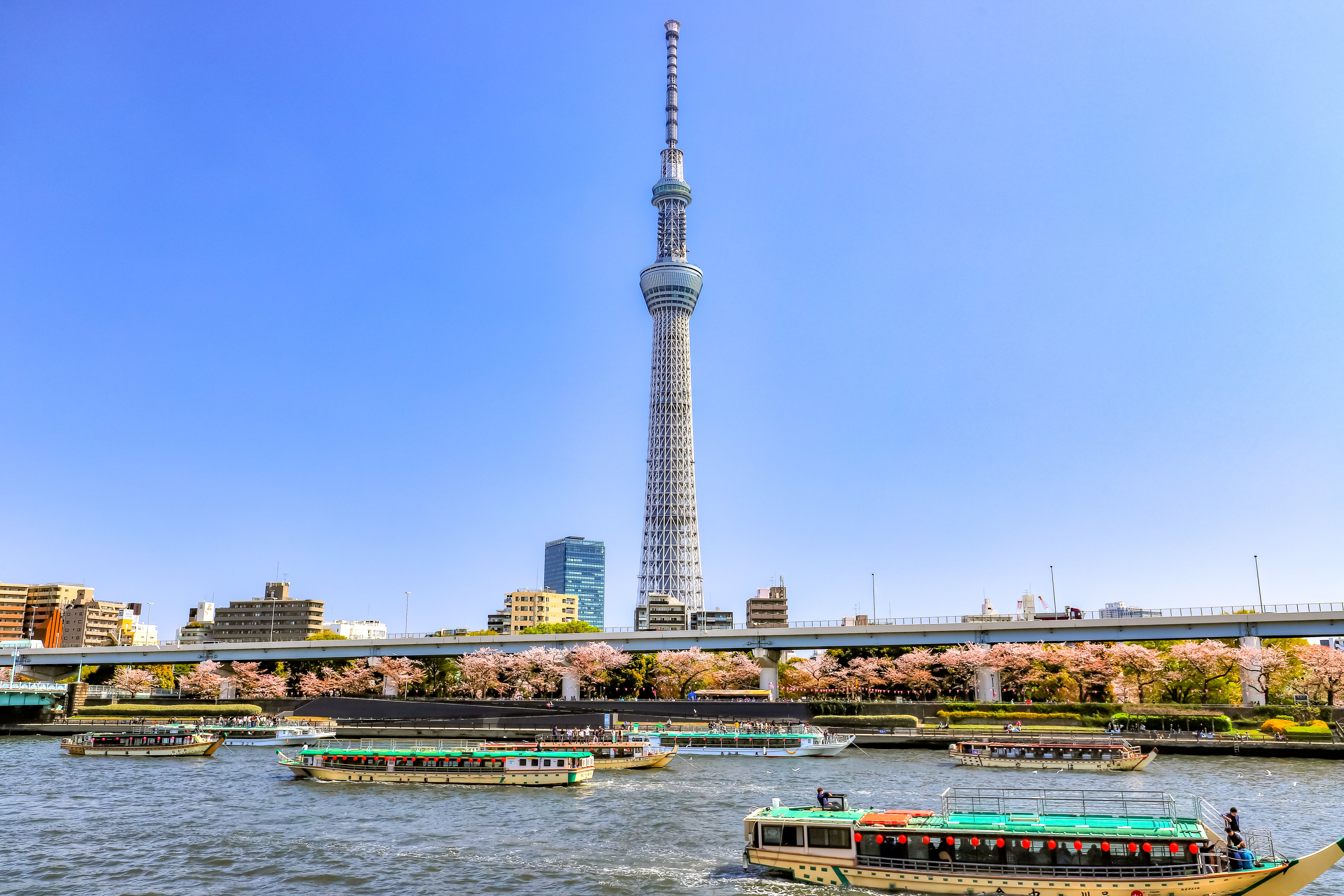
Tokyo Skytree in Sumida, Tokyo, Japan

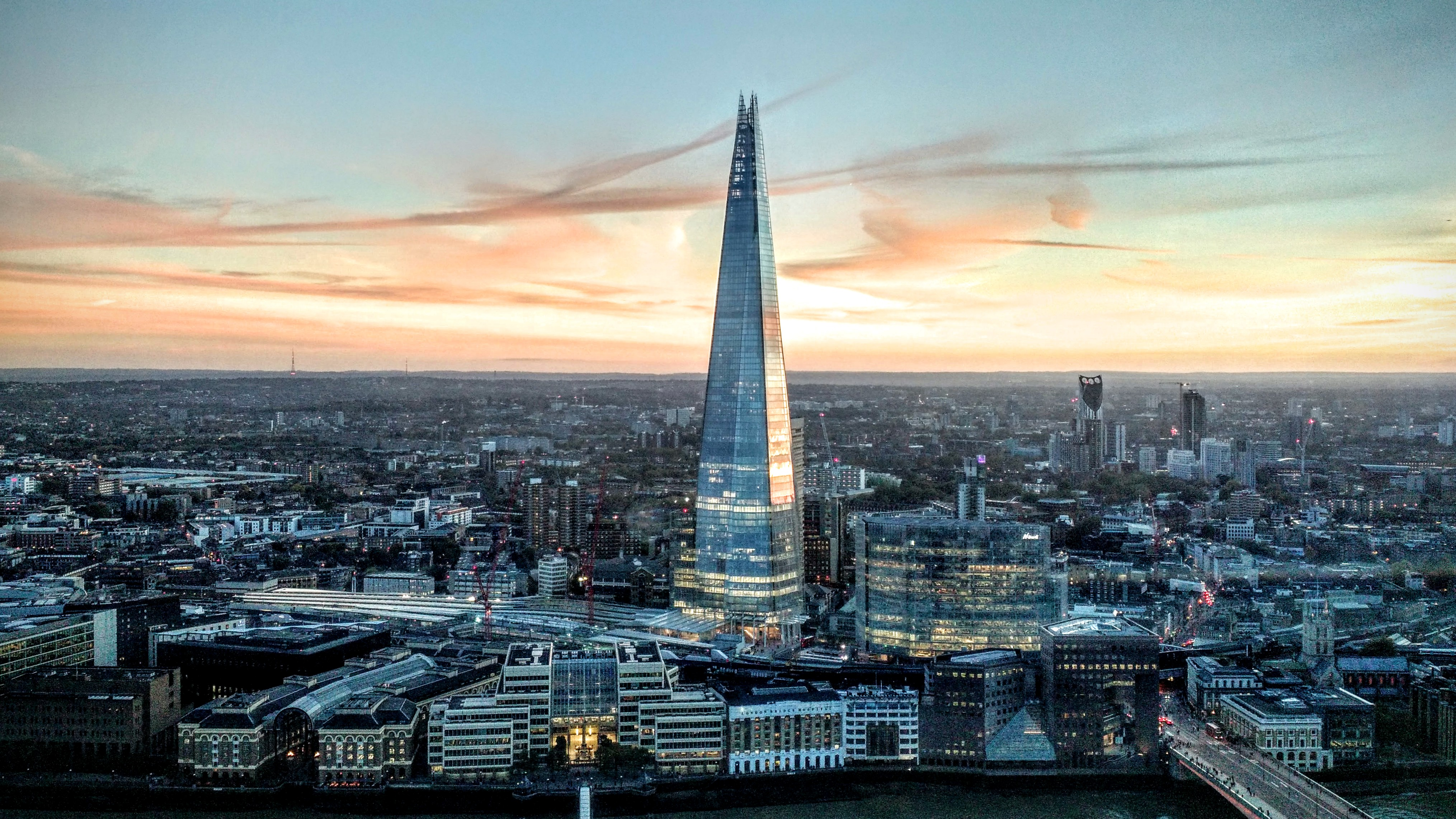
The Shard in London, England

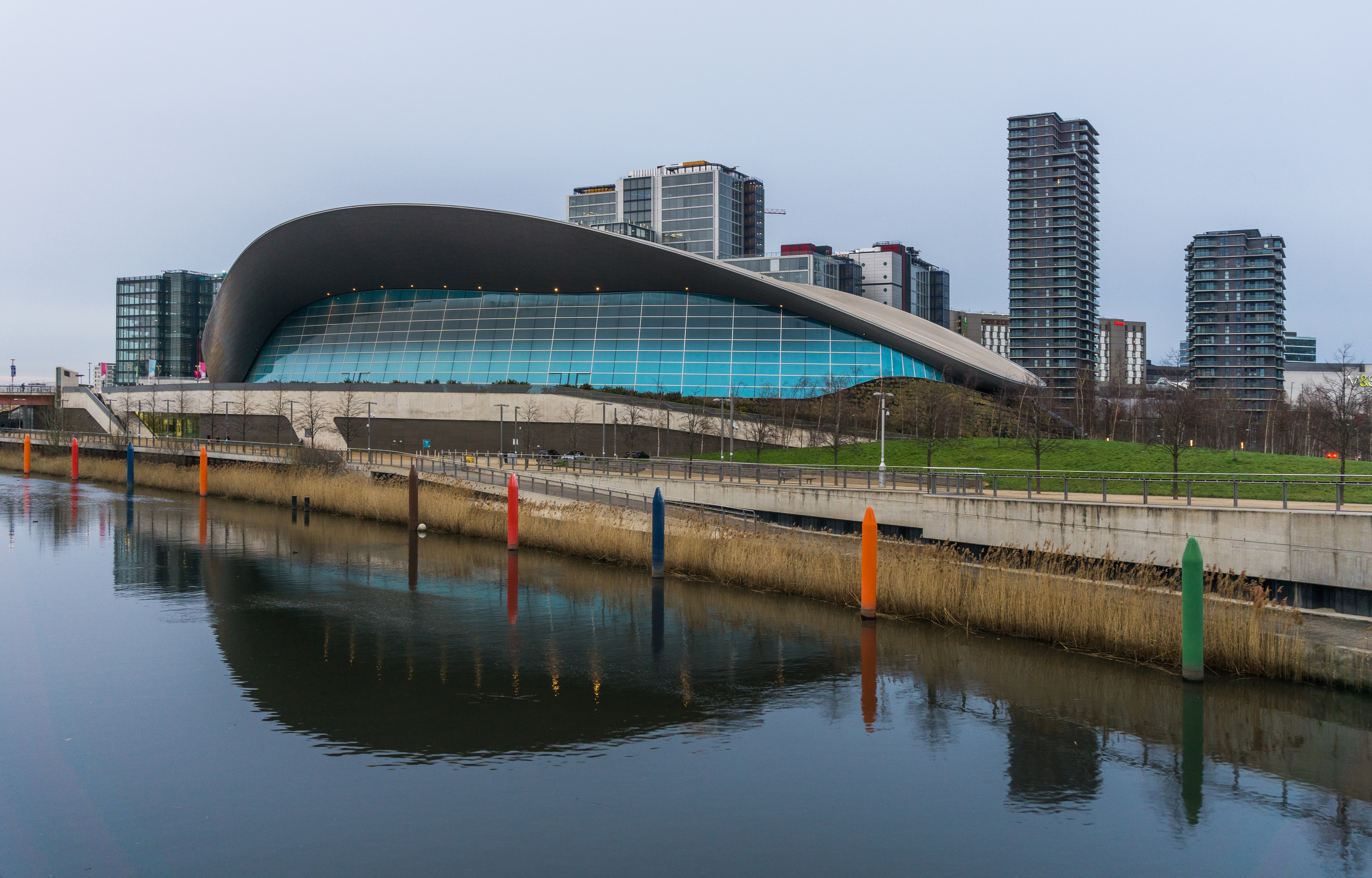
London Aquatics Centre in Queen Elizabeth Olympic Park in Stratford, England

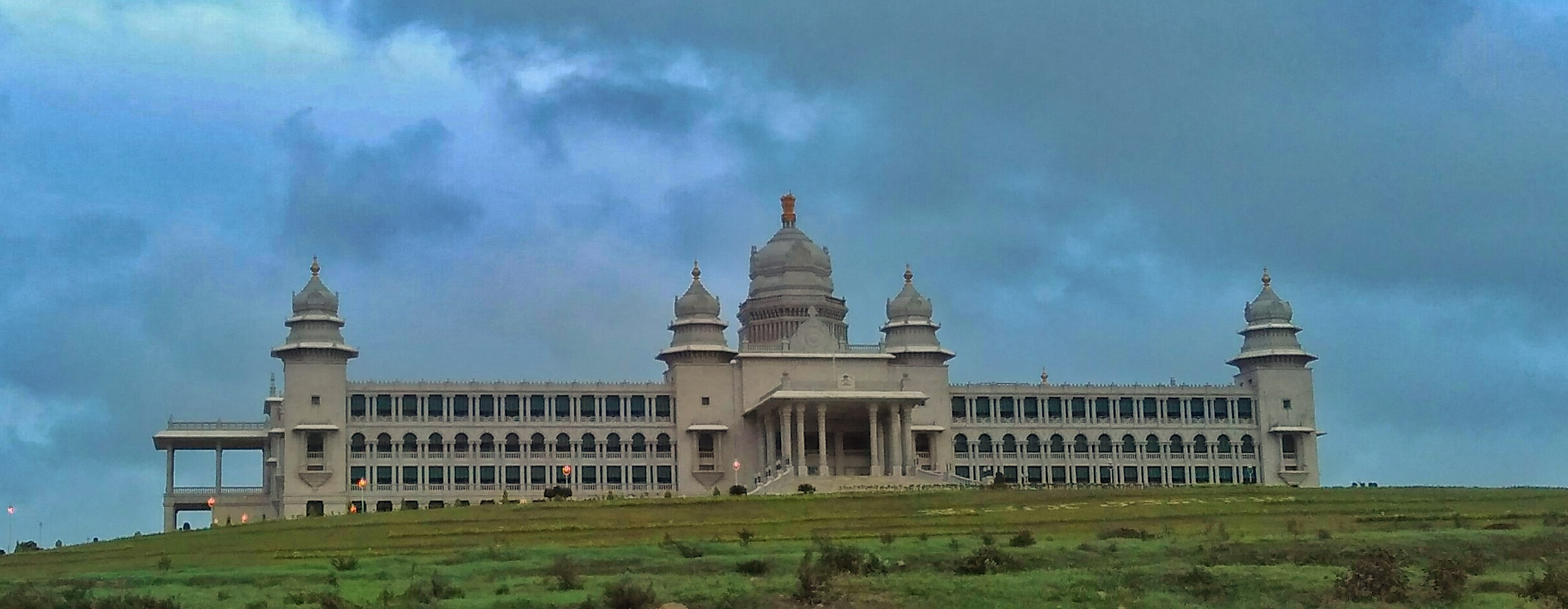
Suvarna Vidhana Soudha in Belgaum, India

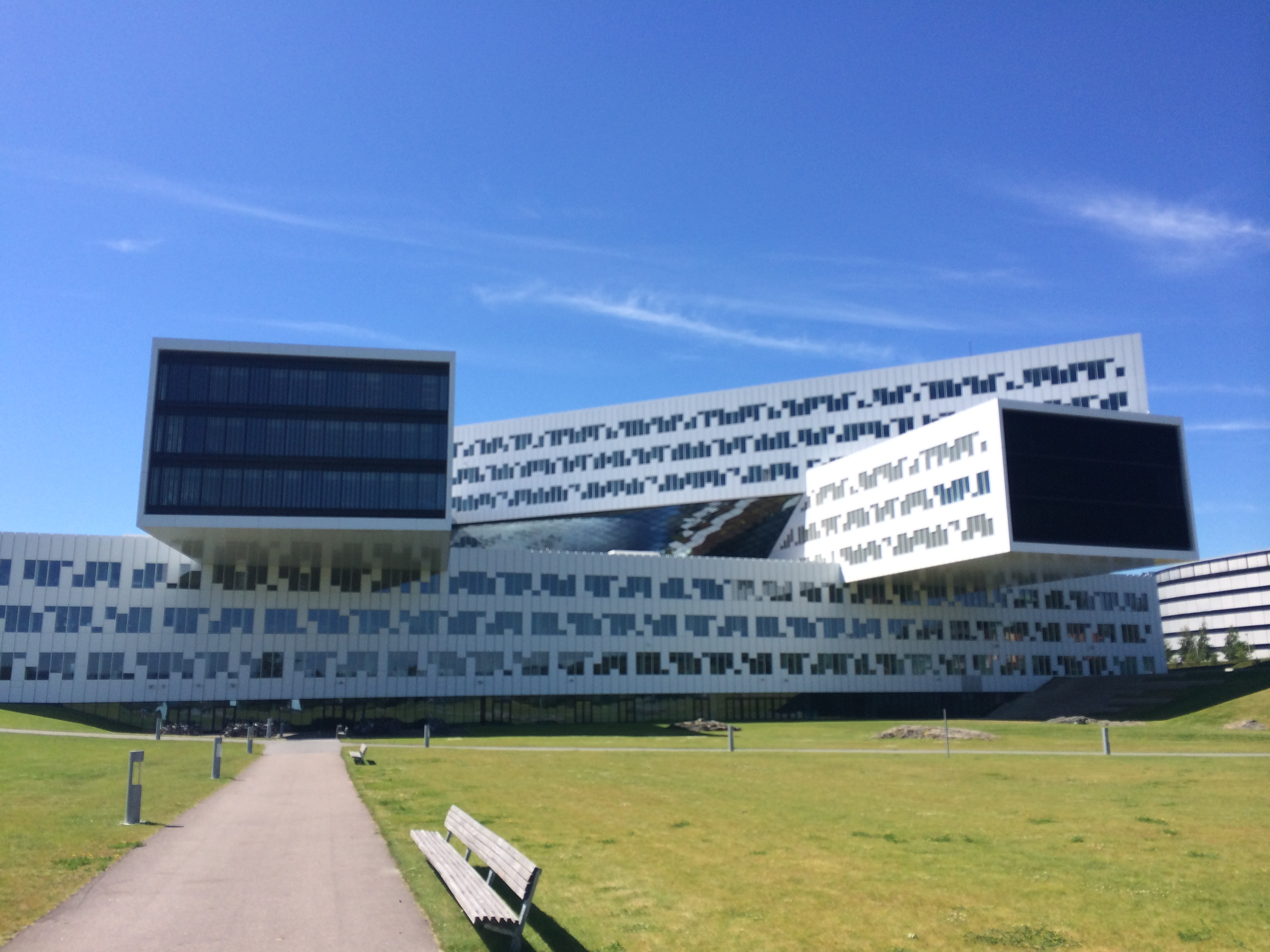
Equinor headquarters building in Fornebu, Norway

- January
  - Isabella Stewart Gardner Museum extension in Boston, Massachusetts, designed by Renzo Piano Building Workshop.
  - JW Marriott Marquis Dubai, the tallest hotel in the world, in Dubai.
- January 1 – Ada Bridge, one of the tallest bridges in Europe, in Belgrade, Serbia.
- January 5 – Baluarte Bridge, the longest cable-stayed bridge in Latin America.
- February – Extension to Städel art gallery in Frankfurt, Germany, designed by schneider+schumacher.
- January 6 – Porta Macedonia, Skopje, designed by sculptor Valentina Stefanovska.
- February 28 – Halley VI Research Station, designed by Faber Maunsell and Hugh Broughton Architects, becomes operational in the Antarctic.
- March – Jerwood Gallery on The Stade in Hastings, England, designed by Hana Loftus and Tom Grieve of HAT Projects.
- March 18 – Bharati (research station) in Antarctica.
- March 19 – Western concourse, London King's Cross railway station, designed by John McAslan + Partners.
- March 24 – Maria Skłodowska-Curie Bridge, Warsaw, the eighth road bridge in the capital of Poland.
- March 29 – Refurbished Museum of Contemporary Art Australia, Sydney with new Mordant Wing, designed by Sam Marshall.
- March 31 – Sandworm by Marco Casagrande, in the Beaufort04 Triennial of Contemporary art in Wenduine, Belgium. The work is both architecture and environmental art.
- April 4 – Twin Sails Bridge, Poole, England, by Wilkinson Eyre Architects.
- April 10 – SeaCity Museum, Southampton, England, with extension by Wilkinson Eyre Architects.
- April 20
  - Asakusa Culture Tourist Information Center, Tokyo, designed by Kengo Kuma.
  - Belfast MAC (Metropolitan Arts Centre) in Northern Ireland, by Hackett Hall McKnight.
- May 10 – Heydar Aliyev Center, Baku, Azerbaijan, designed by Zaha Hadid.
- May 11 – ArcelorMittal Orbit observation tower and sculpture in Olympic Park, London, designed by Anish Kapoor with Cecil Balmond and Ushida Findlay Architects.
- May 22 – Tokyo Skytree in Sumida, Tokyo, Japan.
- June 29 – Cloud Forest and Flower Dome Bay South Conservatories at Gardens by the Bay, Singapore, designed by Wilkinson Eyre Architects (landscape design by Grant Associates).
- July 3 – Giant's Causeway Visitors' Centre in Northern Ireland designed by Heneghan Peng for the National Trust.
- July 5 – The Shard, designed by Renzo Piano, the tallest building in the European Union at the time.
- July 18 – Tate Modern, London, opens The Tanks performance art/installation space, refurbished by Herzog & de Meuron.
- July 27 – Opening of 2012 Summer Olympics based at Olympic Park, London, England, with site design by the EDAW Consortium (including EDAW and Buro Happold), working with Arup and WS Atkins; taken over by LDA Design in conjunction with Hargreaves Associates. Individual buildings include
  - Olympic Stadium, designed by Populous
  - London Aquatics Centre, designed by Zaha Hadid
  - London Velopark, designed by Hopkins Architects, Expedition Engineering, BDSP, and Grant Associates
  - ArcelorMittal Orbit tower, designed by Anish Kapoor (see above)
- August 3 – Queen Elizabeth II Courts of Law, Brisbane, Australia.
- September 21 – Islamic art gallery at the Musée du Louvre in Paris, designed by Mario Bellini and Rudy Ricciotti.
- September 23 – Renovation and new wing for Stedelijk Museum Amsterdam, designed by Benthem Crouwel Architekten.
- October 11 – Suvarna Vidhana Soudha in Belgaum, India, built by B.G. Shirke Construction Technology Pvt. Ltd.
- October 17 – Franklin D. Roosevelt Four Freedoms Park in New York City, designed by Louis Kahn.
- October 24 – Boekenberg ("Book mountain") public library in Spijkenisse, Netherlands, designed by MVRDV.
- December 3 – United States Courthouse, Austin, Texas, designed by Mack Scogin Merrill Elam.
- December 11 – Le Louvre-Lens art gallery in Lens, Pas-de-Calais, France, designed by SANAA.
- date unknown
  - Flame Towers, Baku, Azerbaijan, designed by HOK.
  - ME Hotel, London, designed by Foster and Partners.
  - Astrup Fearnley Museum of Modern Art new buildings are opened in Oslo, Norway.
  - Statoil (now Equinor) Regional and International Offices, Oslo, Norway, by A-Lab Architects, winner of 2012 WAN Award for best office building

=== Buildings completed ===
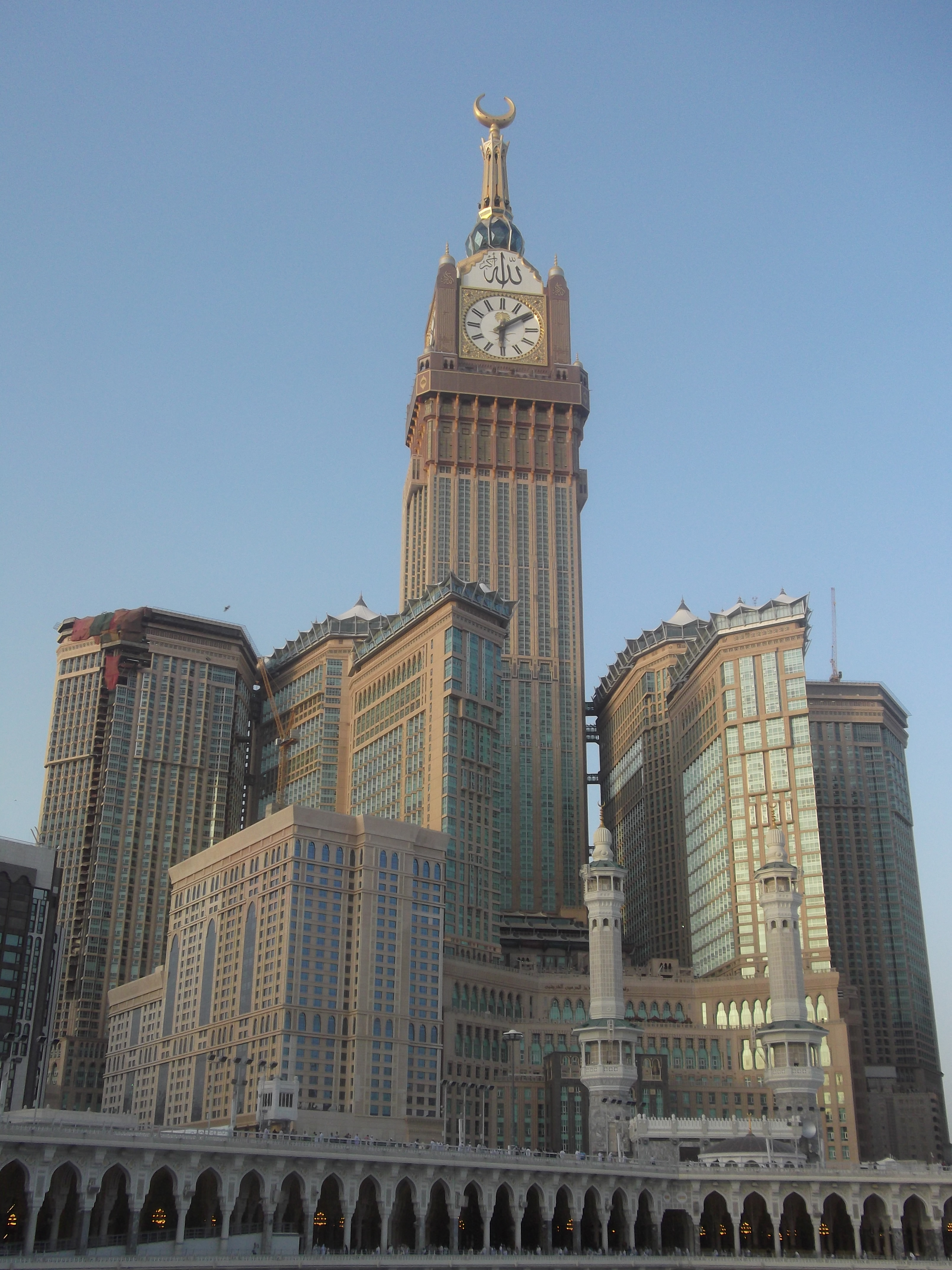
Abraj Al Bait in Mecca, Saudi Arabia

- January 6 – Porta Macedonia, Skopje, Macedonia.
- February 29 – Tokyo Skytree, the tallest tower in the world, is completed in Sumida, Tokyo, Japan.
- June – Airport Link, a 6.7 km road tunnel in Brisbane, the longest in Australia.
- September – NEO Bankside apartments in London, designed by Rogers Stirk Harbour + Partners.
- November 1 – Mercury City Tower, in Moscow, topped-out to become the tallest building in Europe (2012–2014).
- date unknown
  - Abraj Al Bait in Mecca, the tallest buildings in Saudi Arabia.
  - Absolute World in Mississauga, Ontario, designed by Ma Yansong of MAD Studio.
  - Church of Pentecost, Vinkovci, Serbia, a replica of the 18th century church that was destroyed during the Croatian War of Independence.
  - Princess Tower, the world's tallest residential building, is completed in Dubai.
  - The Bow (skyscraper) in Calgary, Alberta
  - Soleil, the tallest building in Brisbane, Australia (until 2014) designed by DBI Design.
  - Community in a Cube, RiversideOne, Middlesbrough, England, designed by FAT.
  - Astley Castle in North Warwickshire, England, restored for the Landmark Trust by Witherford Watson Mann (winner, Stirling Prize, 2013).
  - University of Limerick Medical School in Ireland designed by Grafton Architects.
  - Sarajevo City Center.
  - The Wilson art gallery and museum extension and refurbishment in Cheltenham, England, designed by BGS Architects.

== Awards ==
- AIA Architecture Firm Award – Vincent James Associates Architects
- AIA Gold Medal – Steven Holl
- Carbuncle Cup – Cutty Sark Renovation
- Alvar Aalto Medal – Paulo David
- Driehaus Architecture Prize for New Classical Architecture – Michael Graves
- Emporis Skyscraper Award – Absolute World in Mississauga designed by Burka Architects and MAD Studio
- Lawrence Israel Prize – Diller Scofidio + Renfro
- LEAF Award, Overall Winner – Sou Fujimoto Architects
- Praemium Imperiale Architecture Laureate – Henning Larsen
- Pritzker Architecture Prize – Wang Shu
- RAIA Gold Medal – Lawrence Nield
- RIBA Royal Gold Medal – Herman Hertzberger
- Stirling Prize – Stanton Williams, for Sainsbury Laboratory Cambridge University
- Thomas Jefferson Medal in Architecture – Rafael Moneo
- Twenty-five Year Award – Frank Gehry for Gehry Residence, Santa Monica
- Vincent Scully Prize – Paul Goldberger

== Deaths ==
- January 4 – Rod Robbie, Canadian architect (born 1928)
- January 8 – John Madin, English architect (born 1924)
- February 6 – Norma Merrick Sklarek, African American architect (born 1926)
- March 21 – Bruno Giacometti, Swiss architect (born 1907)
- June 4 – Peter Beaven, New Zealand architect (born 1925)
- June 15
  - Francis Bonaert, Belgian architect (born 1914) was a Belgian architect.
  - Günther Domenig, Austrian architect (born 1934)
- June 19 – Gerhard M. Kallmann, German-born American architect (born 1915)
- July 2 – Angelo Mangiarotti, Italian architect and industrial designer (born 1929)
- August 20 – Dom Mintoff, Maltese architect and Prime Minister (born 1916)
- August 26 – Peter L. Shelton, American architect and interior designer (born 1945)
- October 6 – Ulrich Franzen (born 1921), German-born American architect
- October 26 – John M. Johansen, American architect (born 1916)
- October 30
  - Wayland Tunley, British architect associated with Milton Keynes (born 1937)
  - Lebbeus Woods, American architect and artist (born 1940)
- November 1 – Gae Aulenti), Italian architect, interior and lighting designer (born 1927
- November 4 – David Resnick, Brazilian-born Israeli architect and town planner (born 1924)
- December 5 – Oscar Niemeyer, Brazilian architect (born 1907)
- December 14 – Alan Colquhoun, British architect (born 1921)

== See also ==
- Timeline of architecture
