= North West Cambridge development =

University area in Cambridge, England

Coordinates: 52°13′5″N 0°5′15″E

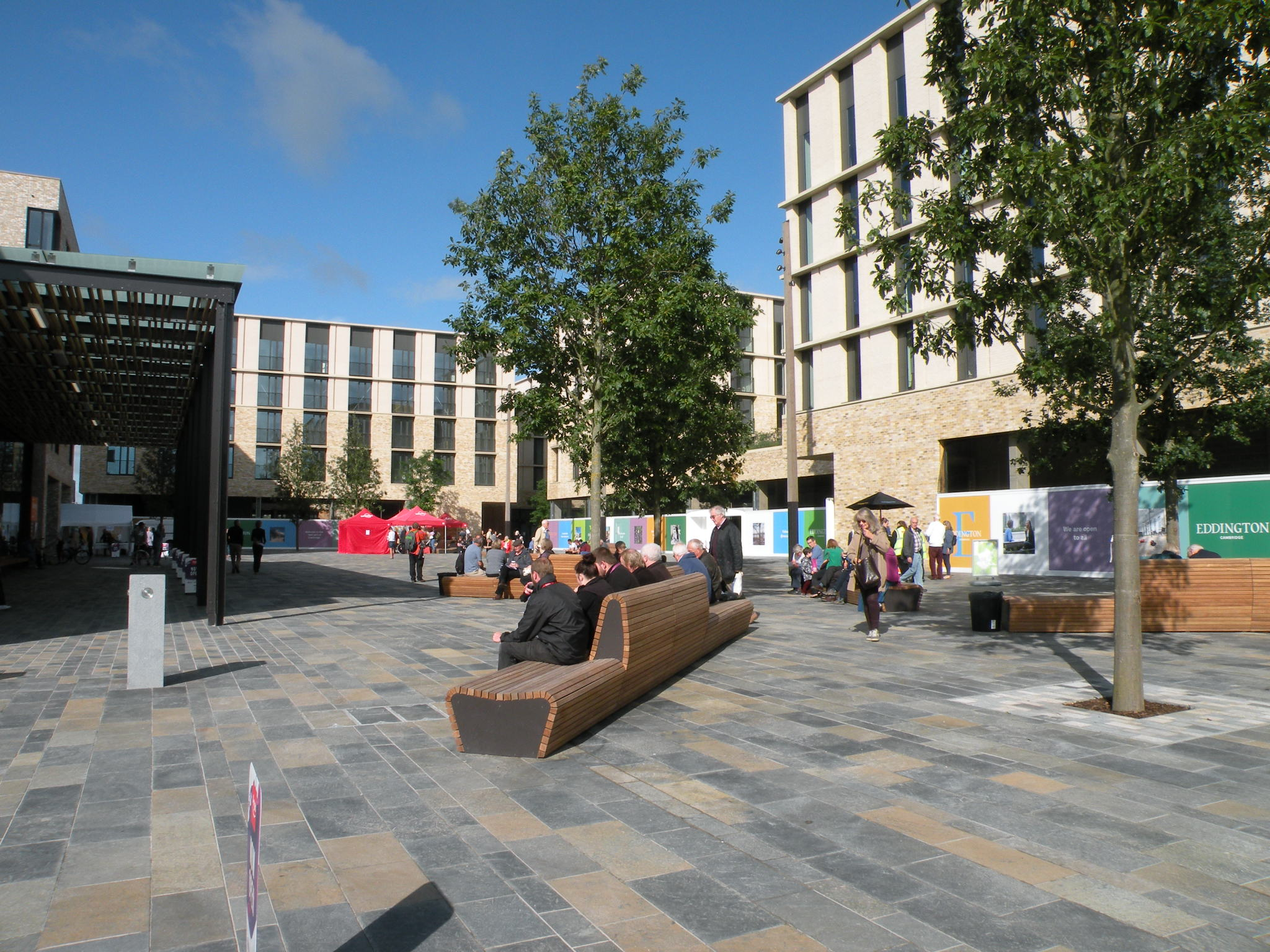
- Eddington market square

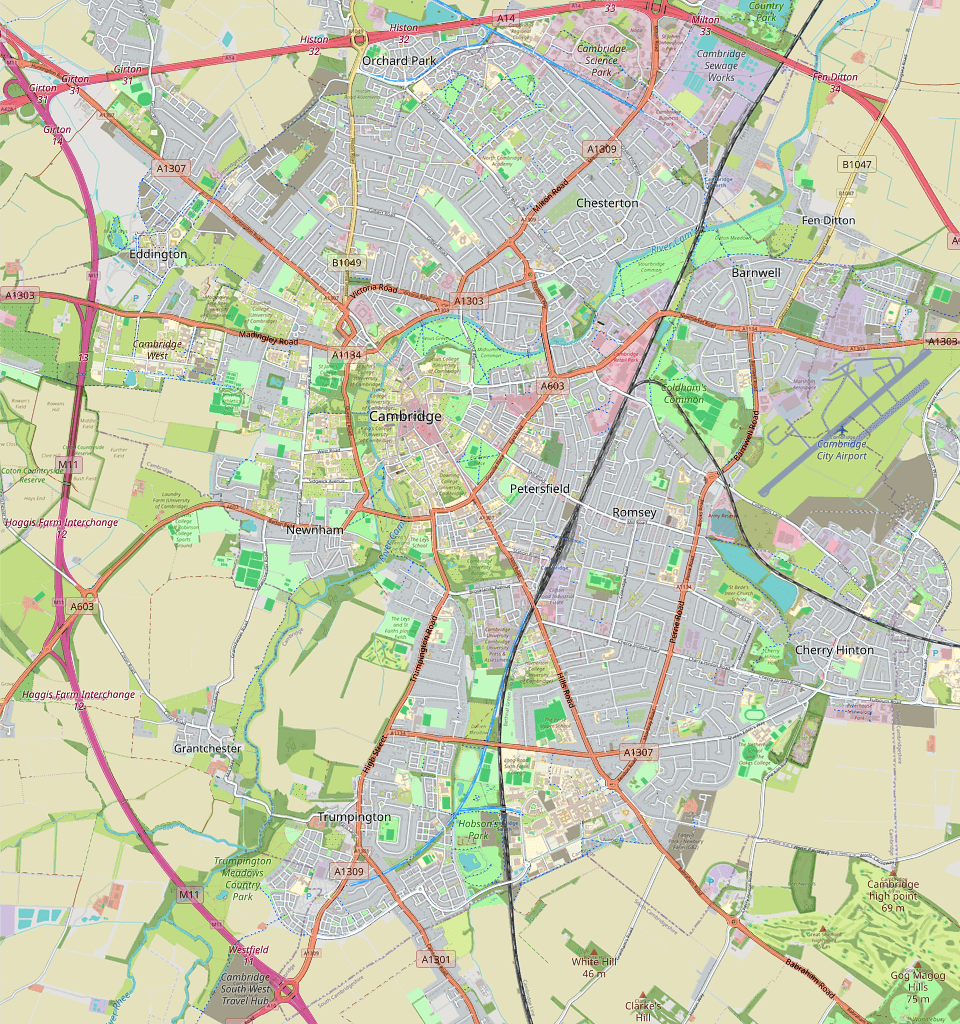
- Location within Cambridgeshire
- District: Cambridge
- Shire county: Cambridgeshire
- Region: East
- Country: England
- Sovereign state: United Kingdom
- Post town: Cambridge
- Postcode district: CB3
- Dialling code: 01223
- Police: Cambridgeshire
- Fire: Cambridgeshire
- Ambulance: East of England
- UK Parliament: Cambridge

The North West Cambridge Development is a University of Cambridge site to the north west of Cambridge city centre in England. The development is meant to alleviate overcrowding and rising land prices in Cambridge. The first phase resulted from a £350 million investment by the university. The development opened to the public for the Open Cambridge event on 9 September 2017.

== Context ==
The 150-hectare (370-acre) site covers the area between the M11 motorway, Madingley Road and Huntingdon Road. The area previously contained farms belonging to the university.

Outline planning permission for the North-West Cambridge Development or University Farm site was granted in 2013. This covers up to 3,000 dwellings, up to 2,000 student bedspaces, 100,000 m^{2} (1,100,000 sq ft) employment floorspace (commercial and academic), retail floorspace, a community centre, health care centre, a primary school and nurseries, a hotel and an energy centre.

The development sets out to achieve high levels of sustainability, including many photovoltaic cells to gather solar energy, low levels of car use, a district heating network with energy centre scheme, communal waste collection systems, and the recycling of rainwater for irrigation and the flushing of toilets.

Architecture practices involved in the development include: WilkinsonEyre, Alison Brooks, Mole Architects, Stanton Williams, Mecanoo, Sarah Wigglesworth Architects, RH Partnership, Marks Barfield Architects, MUMA, Maccreanor Lavington, and Witherford Watson Mann.

== Eddington ==
Eddington is the name given by developers to a local centre in the North West Cambridge Development, after Cambridge astrophysicist Arthur Eddington, who led an expedition to the island of Príncipe to photograph the solar eclipse of May 29, 1919 and verify Einstein's General Theory of Relativity. It is part of Phase I of the North West Cambridge Development, and combines the Castle Ward in the northwest of the city with Girton, a parish in the district of South Cambridgeshire.

In 2018 a very large Roman villa was excavated on a site next to the Park & Ride scheme in Eddington.

Eddington is centred around Market Square, where there is a 2,000 m^{2} (22,000 sq ft) Sainsbury's supermarket. Its one school, the University of Cambridge Primary School, was opened in 2015 and occupies a toroidal building (shaped like a Polo mint) designed by Marks Barfield. The Storey's Field community centre and nursery is adjacent, and was nominated for the 2018 Stirling Prize; key worker housing completed by Stanton Williams in 2019 was nominated for the 2021 Stirling Prize. Graduate students of Girton College are housed at Swirles Court.

An energy centre provides a district heating system, while a sustainable urban drainage system channels rainwater via bioswales to the artificial Brook Leys lake between the site and the M11 motorway. The water is pumped back into homes for washing through a non-potable network.

The Fata Morgana Tea House, designed by the German artists Wolfgang Winter and Berthold Hörbelt, sits on the western bank of Brook Leys lake. Except for the roof, almost the entire two-storey pavilion, including built-in benches, was made from undulating stainless steel welded grating. Depending on light conditions, its polished surfaces can appear shiny or see-through.

These photographs were taken in September 2017:

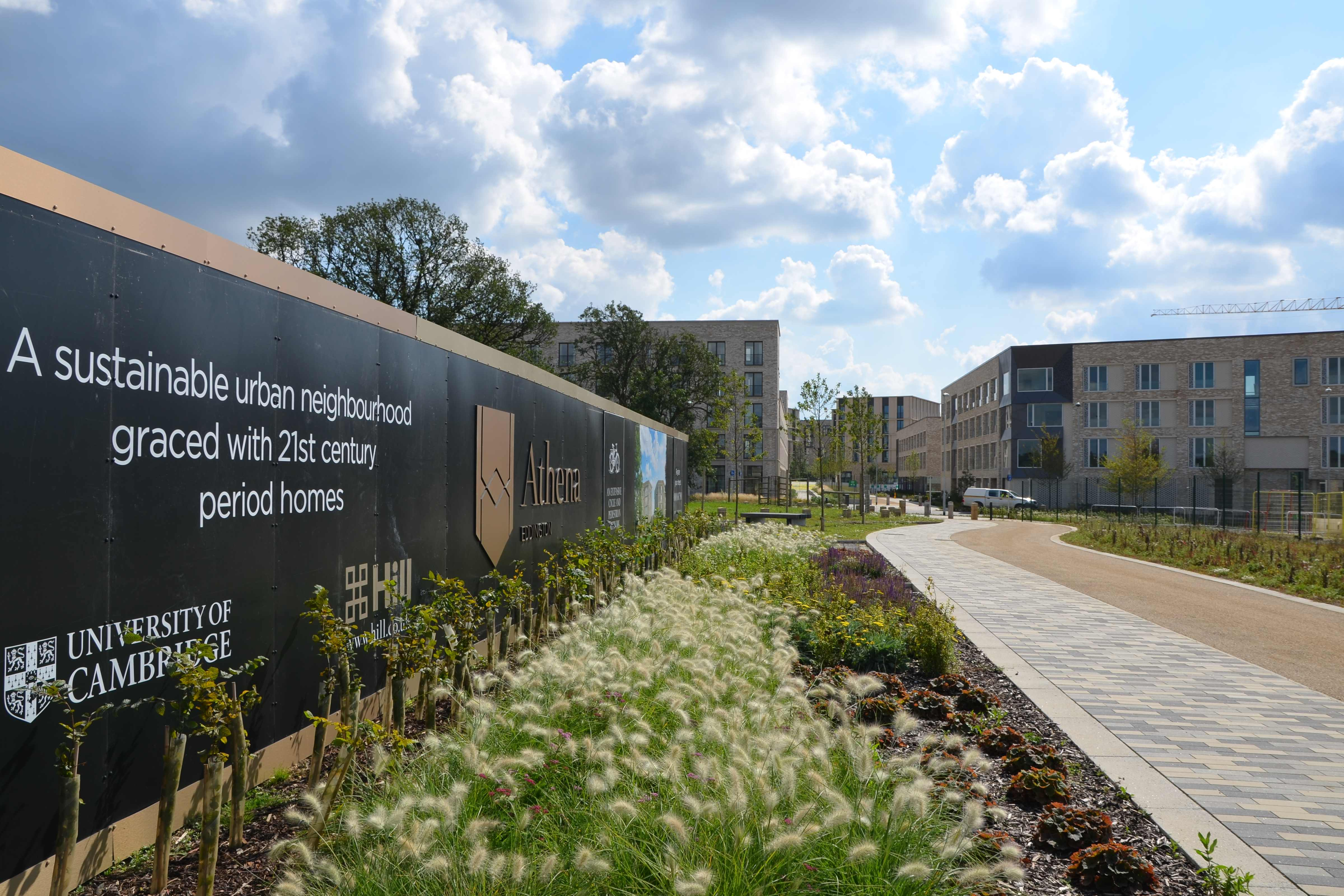
Entrance from Bunkers Hill

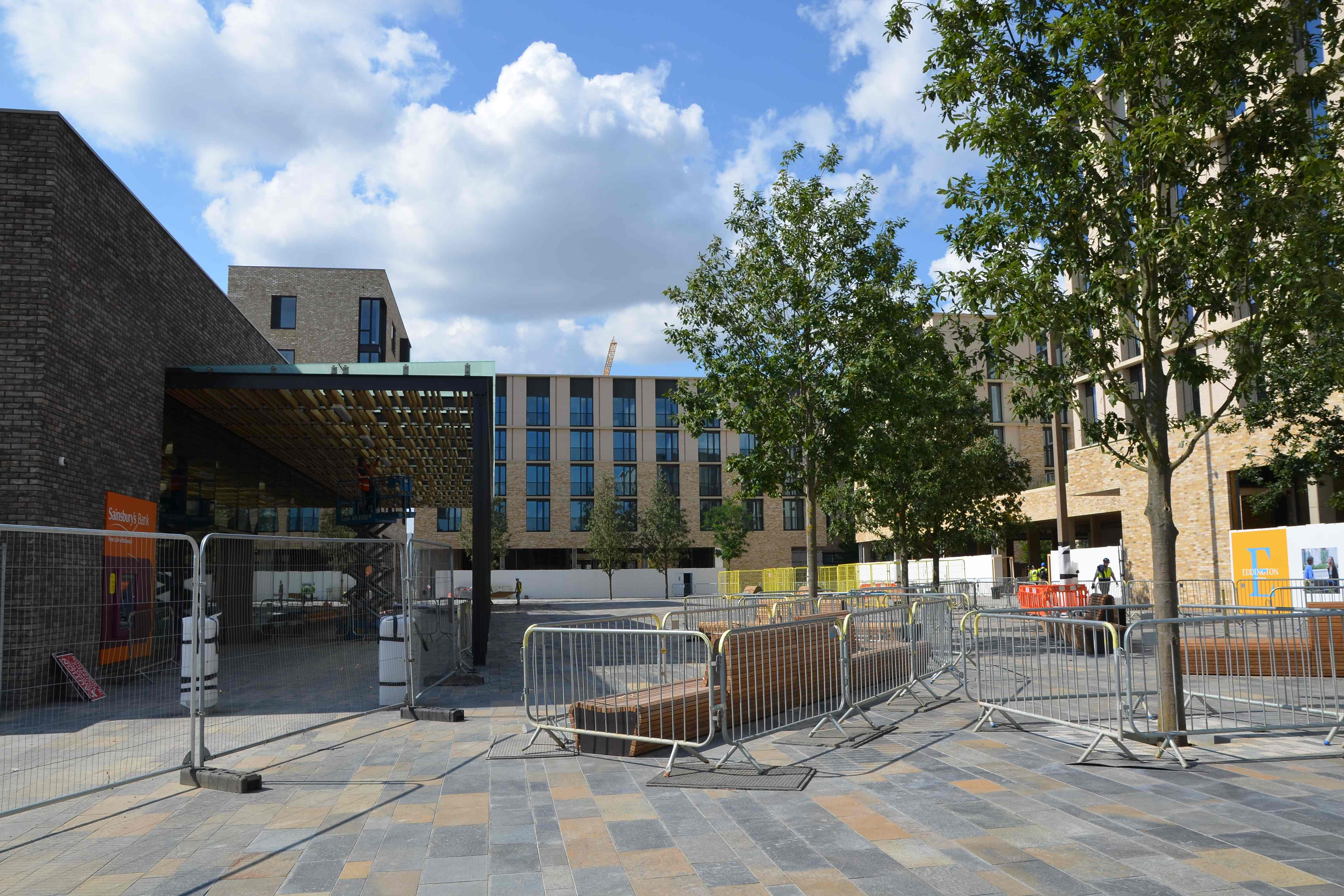
Market square

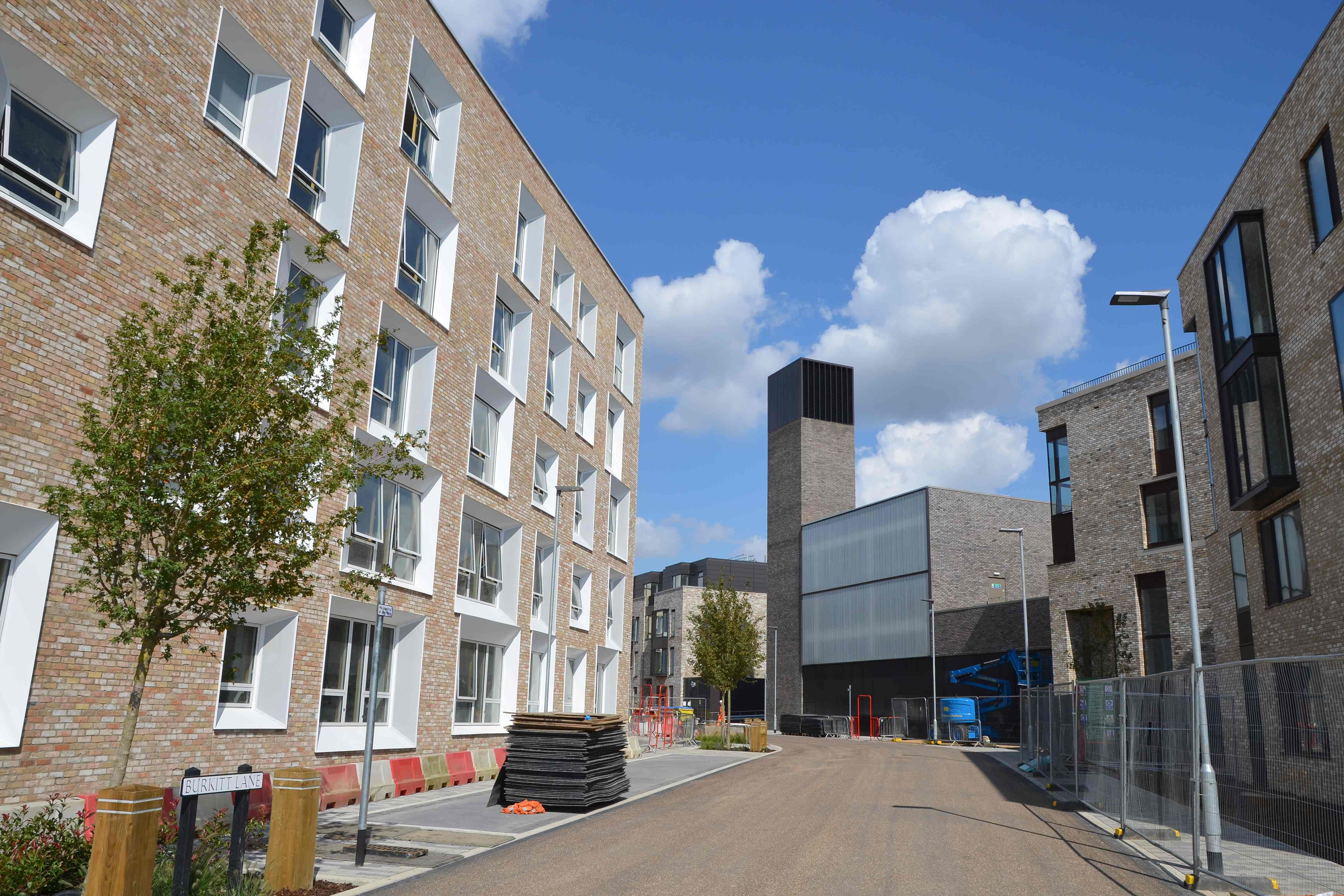
Energy centre

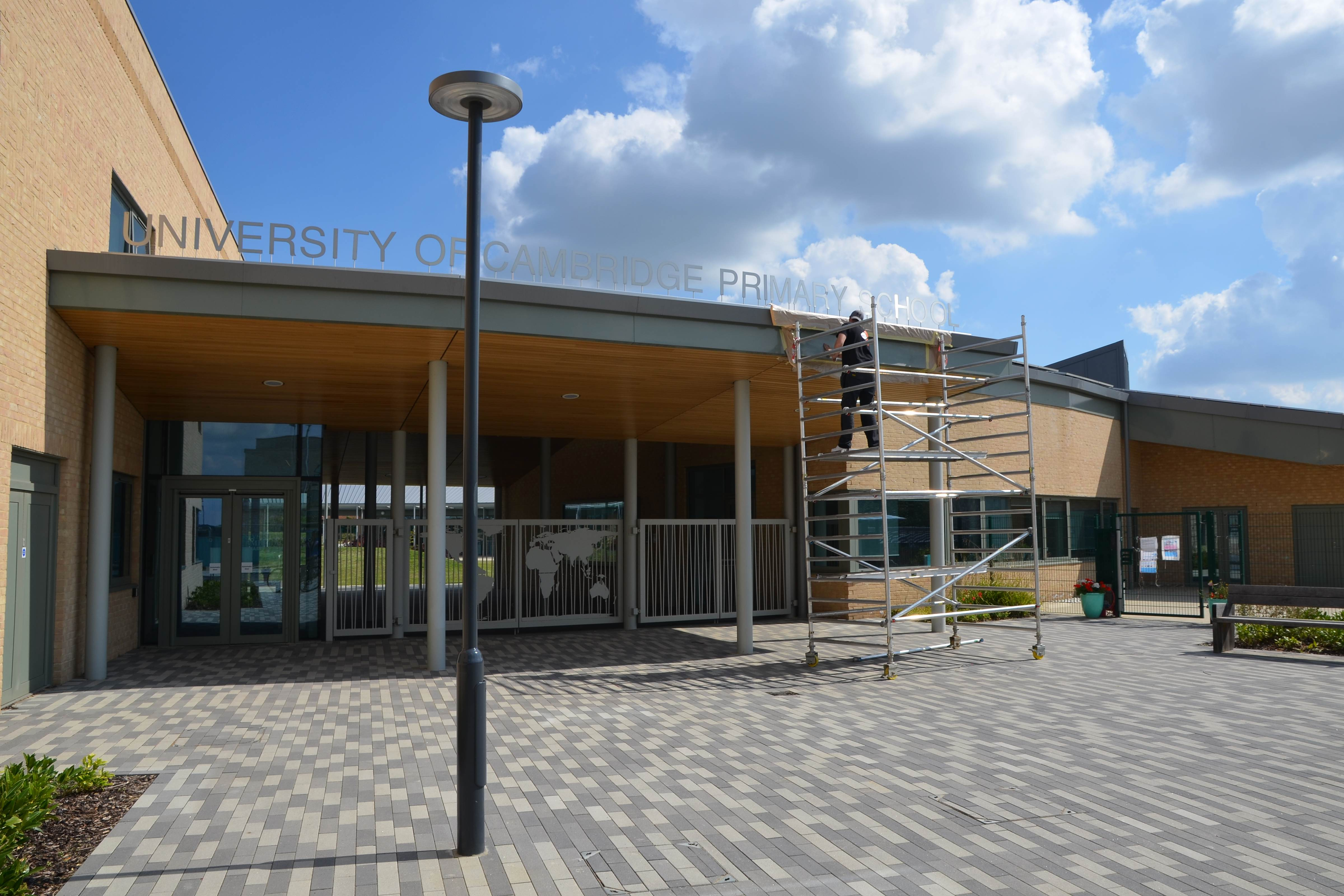
Primary school

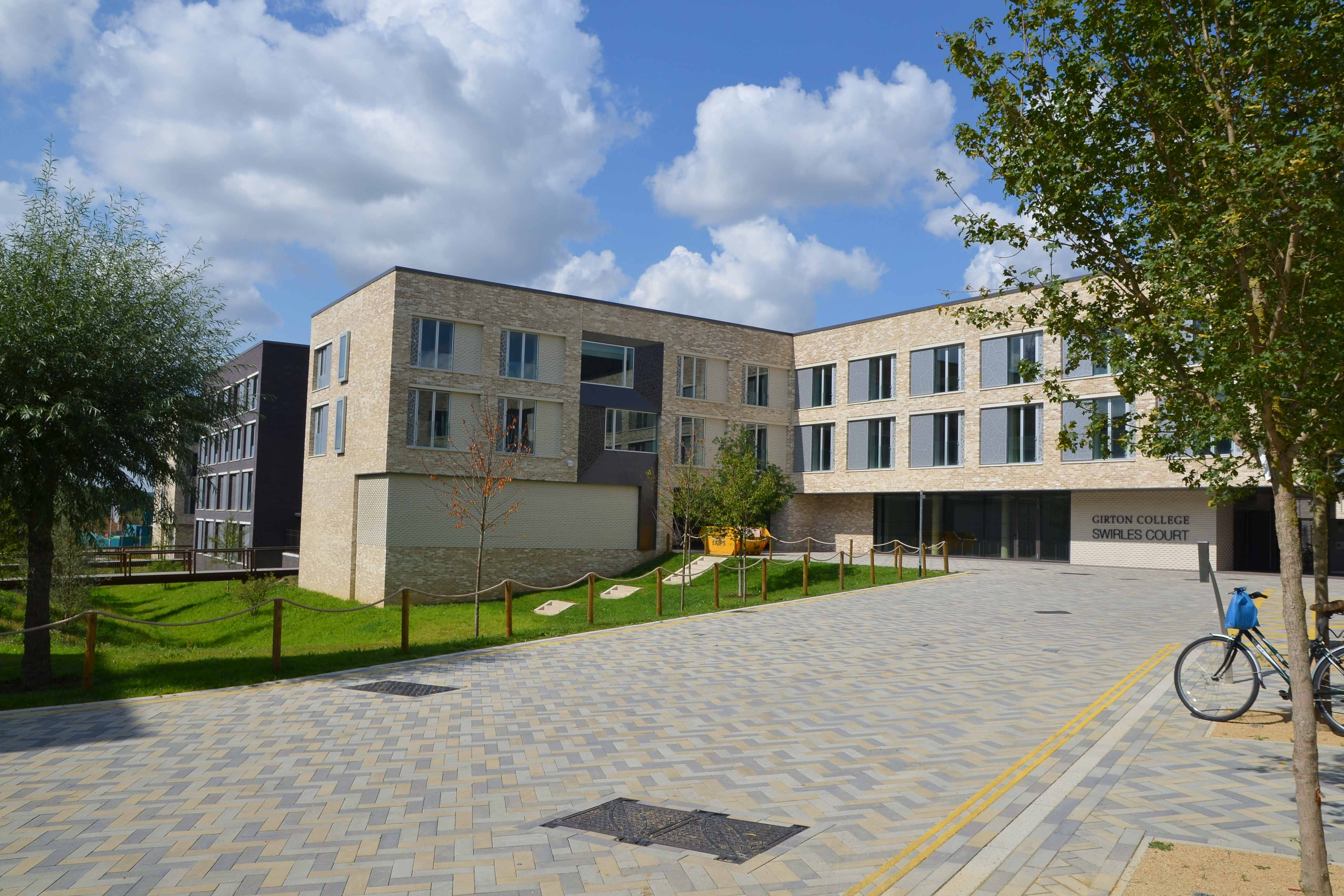
Swirles Court

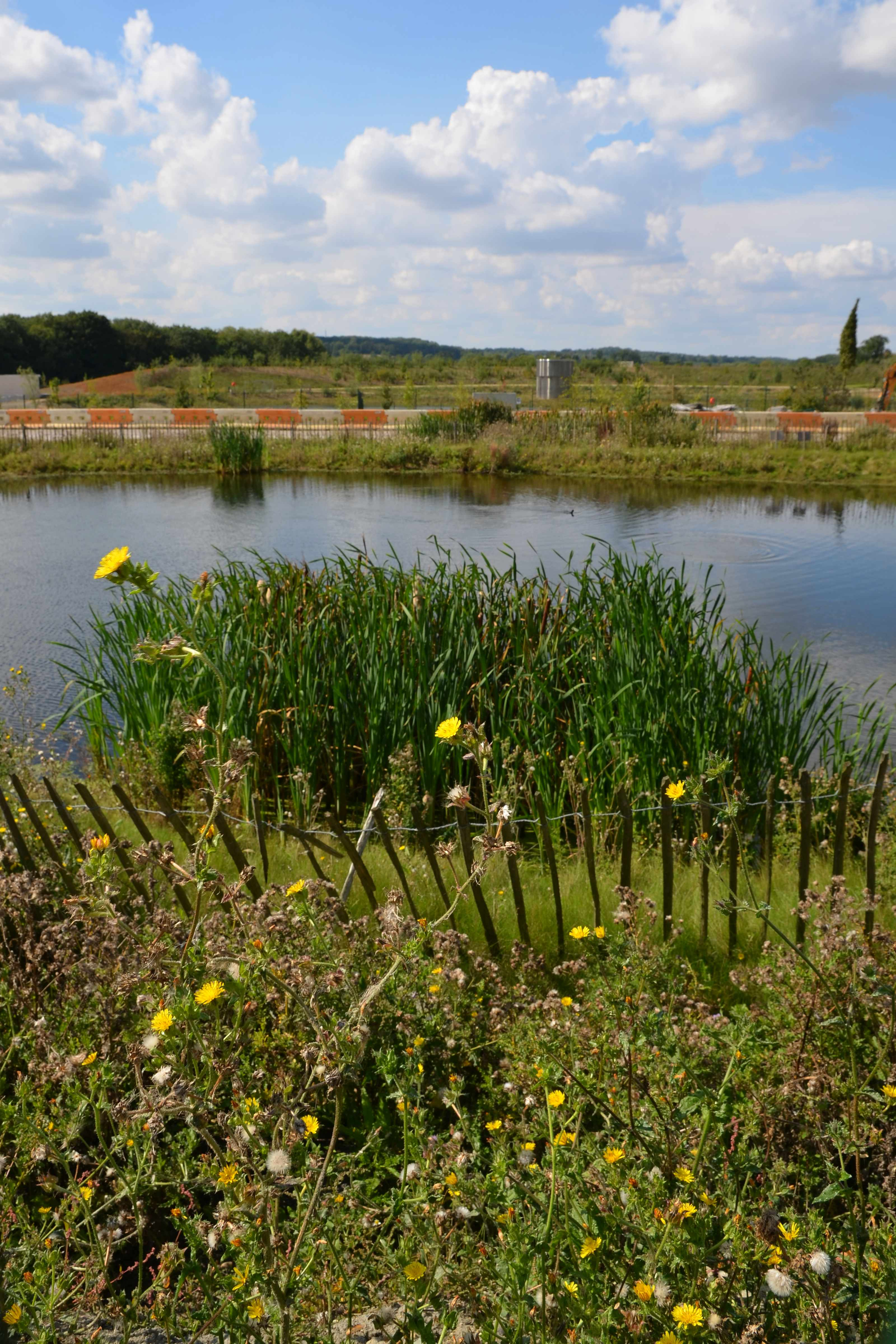
A pond with Fata Morgana in the distance

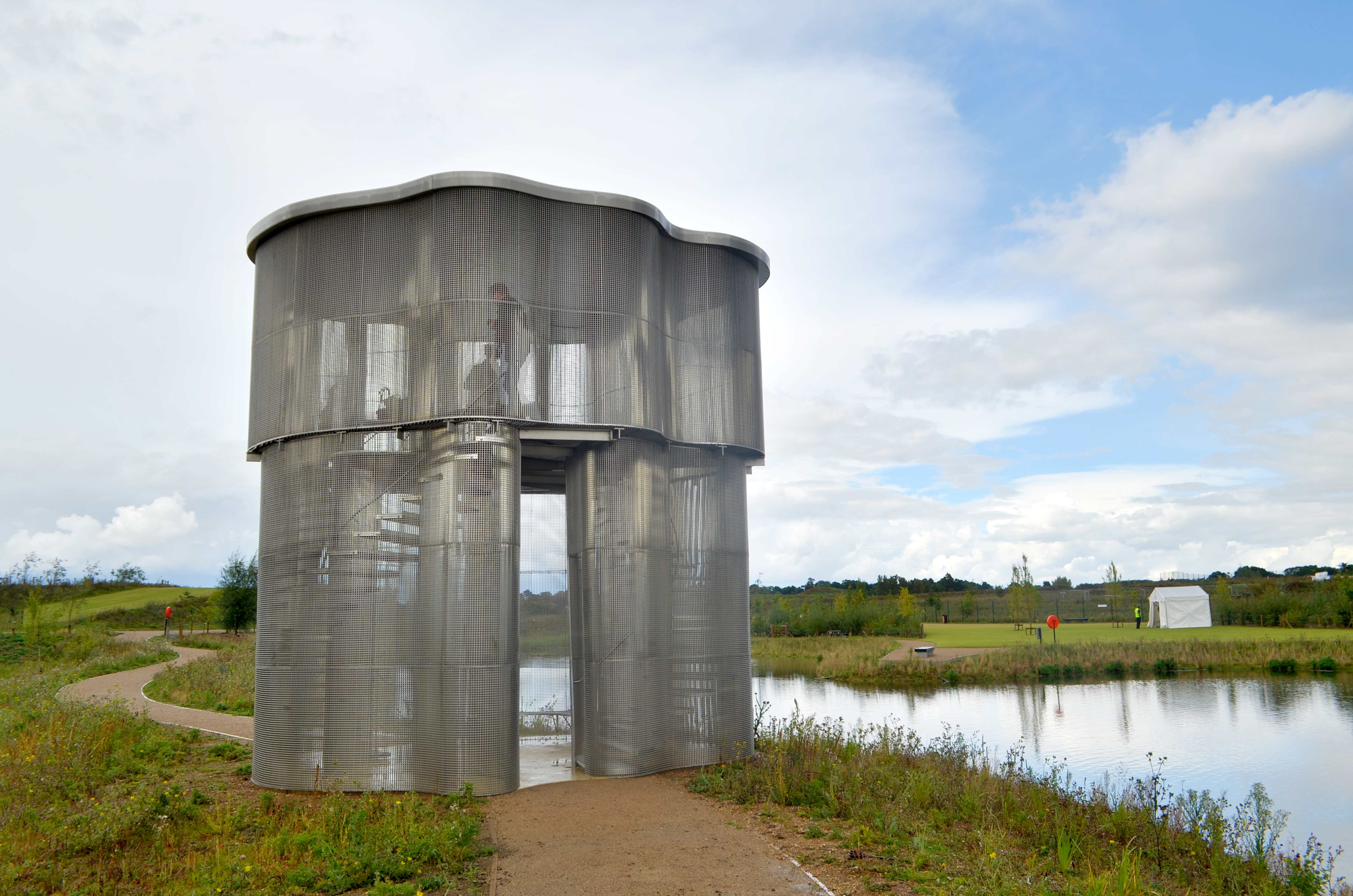
Fata Morgana tea house and Brook Leys

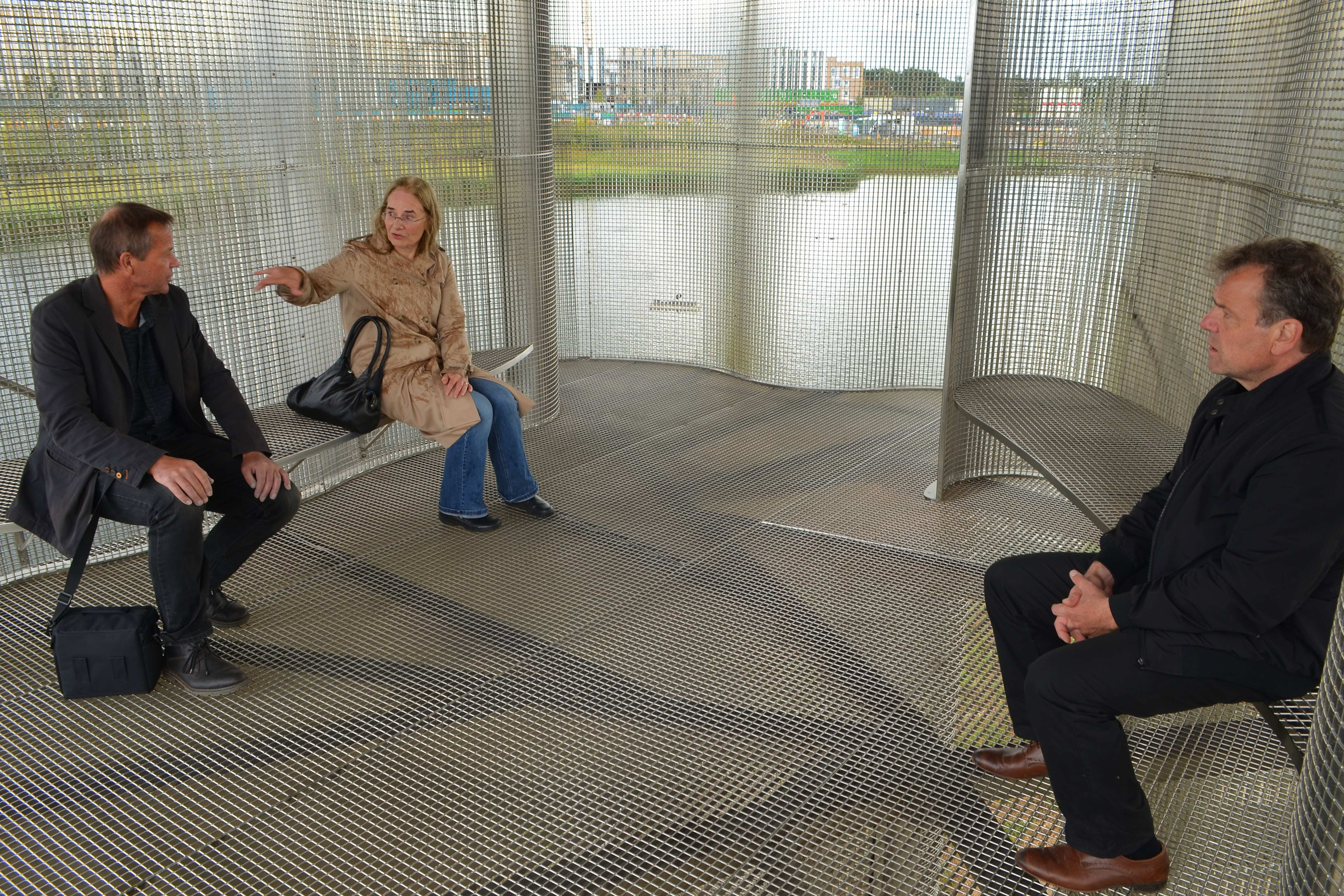
Berthold Hörbelt and Wolfgang Winter in Fata Morgana

== Transport ==
The site is served by the Whippet Universal bus. Madingley Road Park and Ride lies to the south of Eddington. The Ridgeway, a cycle and pedestrian path runs through the site from Girton to Storey's Way.

Eddington has road access to Madingley Road on its south side and Huntingdon Road on the north-east side.

== History ==
- 2009: Area Action Plan adopted by Cambridge City and South Cambridgeshire District Councils. This states:
  - "North West Cambridge will create a new University quarter, which will contribute to meeting the needs of the wider city community, and which will embody best practice in environmental sustainability."
- February 2013: Outline planning permission for North West Cambridge development.
- June 2014: Name of Eddington announced, in honour of Sir Arthur Eddington who lived and worked nearby. Other names announced within North West Cambridge are open spaces Brook Leys and Storey's Field, and residential areas Ridgeway Village and Gravel Hill.
- September 2016: University of Cambridge Primary School, adjacent to Eddington, is officially opened, although its first intake of children started in September 2015. This is the first operational unit of the North West Cambridge development.
- June 2017: Swirles Court, student accommodation for Girton College, is completed. It is named for Bertha Swirles (Lady Jeffreys), a Girton alumna.
- July 2017: the first residents move in to Eddington.
- September 2017: Sainsbury's and Argos stores open. Go Whippet bus service U commences services to Eddington. An open day was held at Eddington with speeches from the University Vice-Chancellor Leszek Borysiewicz and local MPs Heidi Allen and Daniel Zeichner.

== Future development ==
Eddington will include 700 residences for key workers at the University, 325 rooms for postgraduate students, the market square with Sainsbury's and local shops, the energy centre, and the health centre, and a hotel.

The North West Cambridge Development is planned to eventually contain 3,000 homes, accommodation for 2,000 postgraduate students and 100,000 m^{2} (1,100,000 sq ft) of research facilities. The energy centre will be used to produce electricity as demand grows.
