= Stirling Prize =

British prize for excellence in architecture

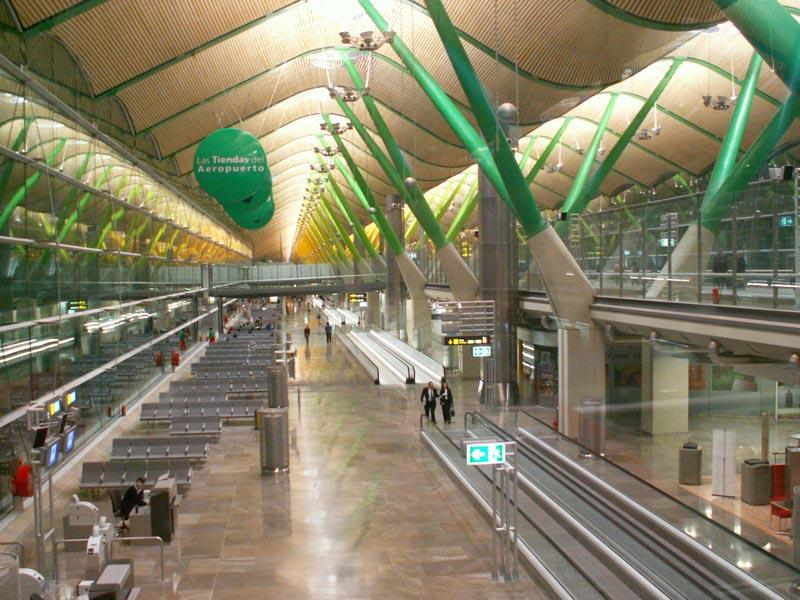
Barajas Airport Terminal 4 interior, Richard Rogers Partnership, 2006.

The Royal Institute of British Architects Stirling Prize is a British prize for excellence in architecture. It is named after the architect James Stirling, organised and awarded annually by the Royal Institute of British Architects (RIBA). The Stirling Prize is presented to "the architects of the building that has made the greatest contribution to the evolution of architecture in the past year". The architects must be RIBA members. Until 2014 the building could have been anywhere in the European Union, but since 2015 entries have had to be in the United Kingdom. In the past, the award included a £20,000 prize, but it currently carries no prize money.

== History ==
The award was founded in 1996, and is considered to be the most prestigious architecture award in the United Kingdom. The ceremony was televised by Channel 4 in earlier years, but recent presentations have been released online by RIBA. Six shortlisted buildings are chosen from a long-list of buildings that have received a RIBA National Award. These awards are given to buildings showing "high architectural standards and substantial contribution to the local environment".

In addition to the RIBA Stirling Prize, five other awards are given to buildings on the long-list. In 2015 they consisted of: the RIBA National Award, the RIBA Regional Award, the Manser Medal, the Stephen Lawrence Prize and the RIBA Client of the Year Award. The set of accompanying RIBA awards has varied since 2015 as the organisation has restructured its awards programme. For years prior to 1996, the award was known as the "Building of the Year Award".

In 2000 several architects from Scotland and Wales made claims of metropolitan bias after five out of seven designs shortlisted by judges were located within London. Critics described the list as "London-centric". The chairman of the judges in the contest rejected the claims, saying that the first Stirling Prize was awarded to a building in Salford, Greater Manchester.

On 30 September 2020, RIBA announced that the awards had been postponed until 2021 due to the COVID-19 pandemic. Judges selected the 2021 prize winner from the 2020 shortlist.

The first Stirling Prize winner, the Centenary Building, was approved for demolition in 2025 and had been fully demolished by October that year. The University of Salford stated that the structure had become unsuitable for modern teaching and research needs, and plans were submitted to replace it with new facilities.

== Laureates and runners-up ==
=== As the RIBA Building of the Year Award ===
Year	Laureate	Winning work	Nominees and works
1987	Jane and David Darbyshire	St Oswald's Hospice, Gosforth, Newcastle upon Tyne	
1988	Evans and Shalev	Truro Crown Courts, Truro, Cornwall	
1989	William Howland	Nelson Mandela Primary School, Birmingham	James Stirling, Michael Wilford and Associates for Tate in the North, Liverpool; Marks and Spencer Kings Meadow Financial Services Centre, Chester; 13 other regional award winners
1990	Colin Stansfield Smith of Hampshire County Architects	Queens Inclosure Middle School, Waterlooville, Hampshire	Herron Associates for Imagination Headquarters, London; Edward Cullinan Architects for RMC Group Headquarters, Egham, Surrey
1991	Peter Foggo of Arup Associates	Broadgate, London	Alsop, Lyall and Störmer for Cardiff Bay Visitors Centre, Cardiff; Terry Farrell and Partners for Embankment Place, London; John Young for Deck House, London; Manser Associates for Sterling Hotel, Terminal 4, Heathrow Airport, London; Bennetts Associates for Imperium Offices, Reading, Berkshire
1992	Norman Foster	Sackler Galleries, Royal Academy of Arts, London	Norman Foster for New Terminal, Stansted Airport, Stansted Mountfitchet, Essex; Michael Hopkins and Partners for Bracken House, London; Richard Rogers Partnership for Reuters Data Centre, Blackwall, London
1993	Nev Churcher and Sally Daniels of Hampshire County Architects	Woodlea Primary School, Bordon, Hampshire	Edward Cullinan Architects for Fountains Abbey Visitors Centre, Aldfield, North Yorkshire; Richard Horden Associates for Queen's Stand, Epsom Downs Racecourse, Epsom, Surrey
1994	Nicholas Grimshaw	Waterloo International railway station, London	35 other regional finalists
1995	Lobb Partnership	McAlpine Stadium, Huddersfield	39 other regional finalists

=== As the Stirling Prize ===
Year	Laureate	Winning work	Nominees and works
1996	Stephen Hodder	Centenary Building, University of Salford, Salford (demolished in 2025)	
1997	James Stirling, Michael Wilford and Associates	Stuttgart Music School, Stuttgart, Germany	Will Alsop for Hotel du Département des Bouches-du-Rhône, Marseille, France; Mark Guard for roof-top apartment, Paris, France; Richard Murphy for Maggie's Centre, Edinburgh; Richard Rogers Partnership for Paul Hamlyn Learning Resource Centre, Thames Valley University, London; Chris Wilkinson for Stratford Market depot, Jubilee line, London
1998	Foster + Partners	Imperial War Museum, Duxford, Cambridgeshire	Rick Mather Architects for a private house, London; Ian Ritchie Architects for Crystal Palace Park Concert Platform, Crystal Palace, London; Ian Taylor with Bennetts Associates for Richard Attenborough Centre, University of Leicester, Leicester; Stephenson Bell for Quay Bar, Manchester (demolished in 2007); Inskip and Jenkins for Temple of Concord and Victory (restoration), Stowe, Buckinghamshire; Günter Behnisch for St Benno School, Dresden, Germany; Günter Behnisch for Landesgirokasse, Stuttgart, Germany; David Chipperfield for an office and studio building, Düsseldorf, Germany; Norman Foster and Partners for Commerzbank HQ, Frankfurt, Germany; Colin St John Wilson for British Library, London
1999	Future Systems	Lord's Media Centre, London	David Chipperfield Architects for River and Rowing Museum, Henley-on-Thames, Oxfordshire; Benson & Forsyth for Museum of Scotland, Edinburgh; Alsop, Lyall & Störmer for North Greenwich tube station, London; Chris Wilkinson Architects for Jubilee Line Extension Project, London; Wilford Associates for Sto AG Marketing and Training Building, Stühlingen, Germany; Foster + Partners for Reichstag, Berlin, Germany; O'Donnell & Tuomey for Ranelagh Multi-Denominational School, Ranelagh, Dublin, Ireland
2000	Alsop & Störmer	Peckham Library, London	Caruso St John for New Art Gallery Walsall, West Midlands; Norman Foster and Foster + Partners for Canary Wharf tube station, London; Marks Barfield for London Eye, London; Richard Rogers Partnership for 88 Wood Street, City of London; Sauerbruch Hutton for GSW Headquarters, Berlin, Germany; Chetwood Associates for Sainsbury's Supermarket, Greenwich, London
2001	Wilkinson Eyre Architects	Magna Centre, Rotherham, South Yorkshire	Nicholas Grimshaw and Partners, Anthony Hunt for Eden Project, Cornwall; Eldridge Smerin for The Lawns, Highgate, London; Jeremy Dixon Edward Jones for National Portrait Gallery extension, London; Guy Greenfield Architects for The Surgery, Hammersmith, London; Michael Hopkins & Partners for Portcullis House and Westminster tube station, London; Michael Wilford & Partners for British Embassy in Berlin, Germany
2002	Wilkinson Eyre Architects & Gifford	Gateshead Millennium Bridge, Gateshead	Malcolm Fraser Architects for Dance Base, Grassmarket, Edinburgh; Edward Cullinan Architects for Weald and Downland Gridshell, Weald and Downland Open Air Museum, West Sussex; David Chipperfield Architects for Ernsting's Service Centre, Coesfeld-Lette, Germany; Building Design Partnership for Hampden Gurney Church of England Primary School, London; Richard Rogers Partnership for Lloyd's Register of Shipping, London; Benson & Forsyth for Millennium Wing, National Gallery of Ireland, Dublin, Ireland
2003	Herzog & de Meuron	Laban, Deptford, London	Bill Dunster Architects for BedZED, Hackbridge, London; Eric Parry Architects for 30 Finsbury Square, London; Foster + Partners for Great Court, British Museum, London; Ian Ritchie Architects for Plymouth Theatre Royal Production Centre, Plymouth; Sutherland Hussey Architects with Jake Harvey, Donald Urquhart, Glen Onwin and Sandra Kennedy for Tiree Shelter, Inner Hebrides, Scotland
2004	Foster + Partners	30 St Mary Axe, London	Studio Daniel Libeskind for Imperial War Museum North, Trafford Park, Greater Manchester; MacCormac Jamieson Prichard with Rummey Design for The Phoenix Initiative, Coventry; Foster + Partners for Business Academy, Bexley, London; Ian Ritchie Architects for Spire of Dublin, Ireland; Peter Cook, Colin Fournier for Kunsthaus, Graz, Austria
2005	EMBT & RMJM	Scottish Parliament building, Edinburgh	Bennetts Associates for Jubilee Library, Brighton; Zaha Hadid for BMW Central Building, Leipzig, Germany; Foster + Partners for McLaren Technology Centre, Woking; O'Donnell & Tuomey for Lewis Glucksman Gallery, Cork, Ireland; Alsop Designs for Fawood Children's Centre, Harlesden, London
2006	Richard Rogers Partnership	Barajas Airport Terminal 4, Madrid, Spain	Adjaye Associates for Whitechapel Idea Store, London; Hopkins Architects for Evelina Children's Hospital, London; Caruso St John Architects for Brick House, London; Richard Rogers Partnership for Senedd (Welsh Assembly building), Cardiff; Zaha Hadid for Phaeno Science Centre, Wolfsburg, Germany
2007	David Chipperfield Architects	Museum of Modern Literature, Marbach, Germany	David Chipperfield Architects for America's Cup Building, Valencia, Spain; Office for Metropolitan Architecture/Arup-AFA for Casa da Música, Porto, Portugal; Foster + Partners for Dresden Station Redevelopment, Dresden, Germany; Glenn Howells Architects, for Savill Building Visitors' Centre, Windsor Great Park, Windsor; Haworth Tompkins for Young Vic Theatre, London
2008	Feilden Clegg Bradley Studios, Alison Brooks Architects and Maccreanor Lavington	Accordia housing development, Cambridge	Grimshaw/Arcadis for Amsterdam Bijlmer ArenA station, Amsterdam, Netherlands; Denton Corker Marshall for Manchester Civil Justice Centre, Manchester; Zaha Hadid with Patrik Schumacher for Nord Park Railway, Innsbruck, Austria; Allies and Morrison for Royal Festival Hall, London; Allford Hall Monaghan Morris for Westminster Academy, London
2009	Rogers Stirk Harbour + Partners	Maggie's Centre, London	Tony Fretton Architects for Fuglsang Kunstmuseum, Lolland, Denmark; Rogers Stirk Harbour + Partners for Bodegas Protos winery, Peñafiel, Spain; BDP for Liverpool One Masterplan, Liverpool; Eric Parry Architects for 5 Aldermanbury Square, London; Allford Hall Monaghan Morris for Kentish Town Health Centre, London
2010	Zaha Hadid	MAXXI – National Museum of the 21st Century Arts, Rome, Italy	David Chipperfield for Neues Museum, Berlin; DSDHA for Christ's College, Guildford; Rick Mather Architects for Ashmolean Museum, Oxford; dRMM for Clapham Manor Primary School, London; Theis and Khan for Bateman's Row, Shoreditch, London
2011	Zaha Hadid	Evelyn Grace Academy, London	O'Donnell & Tuomey for An Gaeláras, Derry, Northern Ireland; Allford Hall Monaghan Morris for The Angel Building, London; David Chipperfield Architects for Folkwang Museum, Essen, Germany; Bennetts Associates for Royal Shakespeare Theatre, Stratford-upon-Avon; Hopkins Architects for The Velodrome, London
2012	Stanton Williams	Sainsbury Laboratory, Cambridge	David Chipperfield Architects for The Hepworth, Wakefield; O'Donnell & Tuomey for Lyric Theatre, Belfast; OMA for Maggie's Centre, Glasgow; OMA with Allies and Morrison for New Court, London; Populous for Olympic Stadium, London
2013	Witherford Watson Mann	Astley Castle, Nuneaton, Warwickshire	Grafton Architects for the medical school at University of Limerick, Ireland; Hawkins\Brown with Studio Egret West for Park Hill, Sheffield; Alison Brooks Architects for Newhall Be, Essex; heneghan peng architects for Giant's Causeway Visitors' Centre, County Antrim, Northern Ireland; Niall McLaughlin Architects for Bishop Edward King Chapel, Ripon College Cuddesdon, South Oxfordshire
2014	Haworth Tompkins	Everyman Theatre, Liverpool	Mecanoo for Library of Birmingham, Birmingham; Zaha Hadid for London Aquatics Centre, London; Renzo Piano for The Shard, London; O'Donnell & Tuomey for Saw Swee Hock Student Centre at LSE, London; Feilden Clegg Bradley Studios for Manchester School of Art, Manchester
2015	Allford Hall Monaghan Morris	Burntwood School, Wandsworth, London	Niall McLaughlin Architects for Darbishire Place, Whitechapel, London; Reiach and Hall Architects for Maggie's Centre Lanarkshire, Airdrie, Scotland; Rogers Stirk Harbour + Partners for NEO Bankside, Bankside, London; heneghan peng architects for University of Greenwich Stockwell Street Building, Greenwich, London; McInnes Usher McKnight Architects (MUMA) for Whitworth Art Gallery extension, Manchester
2016	Caruso St John Architects	Newport Street Gallery, Vauxhall, London	Herzog & de Meuron for Blavatnik School of Government, University of Oxford, Oxford; Loyn & Co Architects for Outhouse (private residence), Forest of Dean, Gloucestershire; Michael Laird Architects & Reiach and Hall Architects for Riverside Campus, City of Glasgow College, Glasgow, Scotland; dRMM Architects for Trafalgar Place housing, Elephant and Castle, London; Wilkinson Eyre Architects for Weston Library, University of Oxford, Oxford
2017	dRMM	Hastings Pier, East Sussex	Groupwork + Amin Taha for Barrett's Grove housing scheme, Stoke Newington, London; Rogers Stirk Harbour + Partners for British Museum World Conservation and Exhibitions Centre, London; Reiach and Hall Architects and Michael Laird Architects for City Campus at the City of Glasgow College, Glasgow; Baynes and Mitchell Architects for Command of the Oceans display at Chatham Historic Dockyard, Chatham, Kent; 6a architects for Photography Studio for Juergen Teller, London
2018	Foster + Partners	Bloomberg London	Waugh Thistleton Architects for Bushey Cemetery, Bushey, Hertfordshire; Henley Halebrown for Chadwick Hall, University of Roehampton, London; Jamie Fobert Architects with Evans & Shalev for the new build at Tate St Ives, Cornwall; MUMA for Storey's Field Community Centre and Nursery, North West Cambridge; Niall McLaughlin Architects for The Sultan Nazrin Shah Centre, Worcester College, Oxford
2019	Mikhail Riches with Cathy Hawley	Goldsmith Street council housing, Norwich	Matthew Barnett Howland with Dido Milne and Oliver Wilton for Cork House, Berkshire; Grimshaw Architects for London Bridge station, Southwark, London; Rogers Stirk Harbour + Partners for The Macallan distillery and Visitor Experience, Moray, Scotland; Witherford Watson Mann for Nevill Holt Opera, Leicestershire; Feilden Fowles for The Weston, Yorkshire Sculpture Park, West Yorkshire
2020	Award postponed until 2021 due to COVID-19 pandemic		
2021	Grafton Architects	Kingston University Town House, London	Marks Barfield for Cambridge Central Mosque; Ney & Partners and William Matthews Associates for Tintagel Castle footbridge, North Cornwall; Carmody Groarke for Windermere Jetty Museum; Stanton Williams for Key Worker Housing, Eddington, Cambridge; Amin Taha for 15 Clerkenwell Close, Islington, London
2022	Niall McLaughlin Architects	The New Library, Magdalene College, Cambridge	Hopkins Architects for 100 Liverpool Street, London; Reiach and Hall Architects for Forth Valley College – Falkirk Campus, Scotland; Henley Halebrown for Hackney New Primary School and 333 Kingsland Road, London; Panter Hudspith Architects for Orchard Gardens, Elephant Park, Elephant and Castle, London; Mæ for Sands End Arts and Community Centre, Fulham, London
2023	Mæ	John Morden Centre, Morden College, Blackheath, London	Apparata for A House for Artists, Barking, London; Adam Khan Architects for Central Somers Town Community Facilities and Housing, Camden, London; Witherford Watson Mann for Courtauld Connects, Westminster, London; Sergison Bates for Lavender Hill Courtyard Housing, Clapham, London; Feilden Clegg Bradley Studios for University of Warwick Faculty of Arts, Coventry
2024	Grimshaw, Maynard, Equation and Atkins	Elizabeth line, London	Al-Jawad Pike for Chowdhury Walk, London; Allies and Morrison and Porphyrios Associates for King's Cross Masterplan, London; Jamie Fobert Architects and Purcell for National Portrait Gallery, London; Mikhail Riches for Park Hill Phase 2, Sheffield; Clementine Blakemore Architects for Wraxall Yard, Dorset
2025	Witherford Watson Mann	Appleby Blue Almshouse, Southwark, London	Purcell for Elizabeth Tower, Westminster, London; Hugh Strange Architects for Hastings House, Hastings, East Sussex; Allies and Morrison for London College of Fashion, Stratford, London; Takero Shimazaki Architects for Niwa House, East Dulwich, London; Herzog & de Meuron/BDP for The Discovery Centre, Cambridge
2026	Mary Duggan Architects with RUFF Architects	Lion Green Road, Coulsdon, Croydon	Sergison Bates for a house at Fairmead, Epping Forest; Bennetts Associates for BEAM, Hertford, Hertfordshire; Renzo Piano Building Workshop with Adamson Associates for Paddington Square, London; Haworth Tompkins for Pembroke College, Cambridge; Witherford Watson Mann for River Wing, Clare College, Cambridge

== See also ==
- List of architecture prizes
