= Astley, Warwickshire =

Village in North Warwickshire, England

Coordinates: 52.502°N 1.543°W

Astley
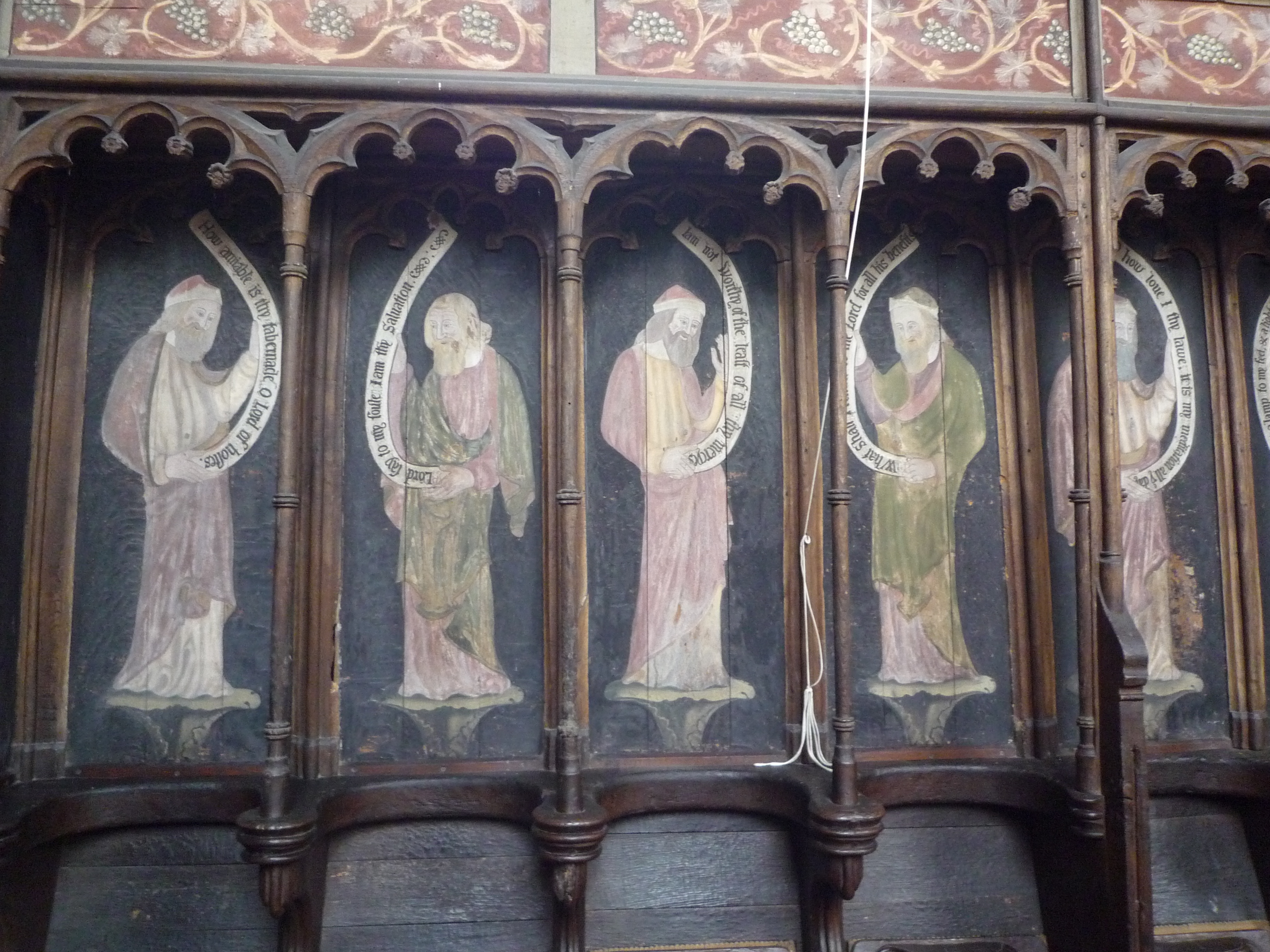
- Painted stalls in the church of St Mary the Virgin

- Location within Warwickshire
- Population: 264 (2021)
- OS grid reference: SP311894
- Civil parish: Astley
- District: North Warwickshire
- Shire county: Warwickshire
- Region: West Midlands
- Country: England
- Sovereign state: United Kingdom
- Post town: NUNEATON
- Postcode district: CV10
- Police: Warwickshire
- Fire: Warwickshire
- Ambulance: West Midlands

Astley is a small village and civil parish within the North Warwickshire district of Warwickshire, England. In the 2001 census it had a population of 219, reducing slightly to 218 at the 2011 census, increasing to 264 at the 2021 census. Astley is Knebly in George Eliot's Mr Gilfil's Love Story, published in 1857. Eliot's parents were married in the church.

== St Mary the Virgin ==
The parish church was rebuilt by Sir Thomas Astley in 1343. An Anglo-Saxon carving of a sundial from an earlier church was preserved in the tower. Thomas Grey was entombed in the church in 1530. The present church dates from another rebuild in 1617 by the Chamberlayne family. It is mainly the chancel of the 1343 building and the original east window incorporated into the tower. Preserved in the church are effigies of the Grey family, eighteen choir stalls painted with images of the prophets and apostles and, on the ceiling, 21 heraldic shields of Midlands families.

== Astley Castle ==
Astley Castle, a Grade II* listed building, is the last of three castles built on the same site and using the same moat. The castle was held by the Newdigate family in the 19th century, latterly being the home of Lieut-Gen. Edward Newdigate Newdegate. It was later a hotel, and was a ruin following a fire in 1978. The Landmark Trust has transformed the castle into a holiday home by constructing a new building within the ruin.

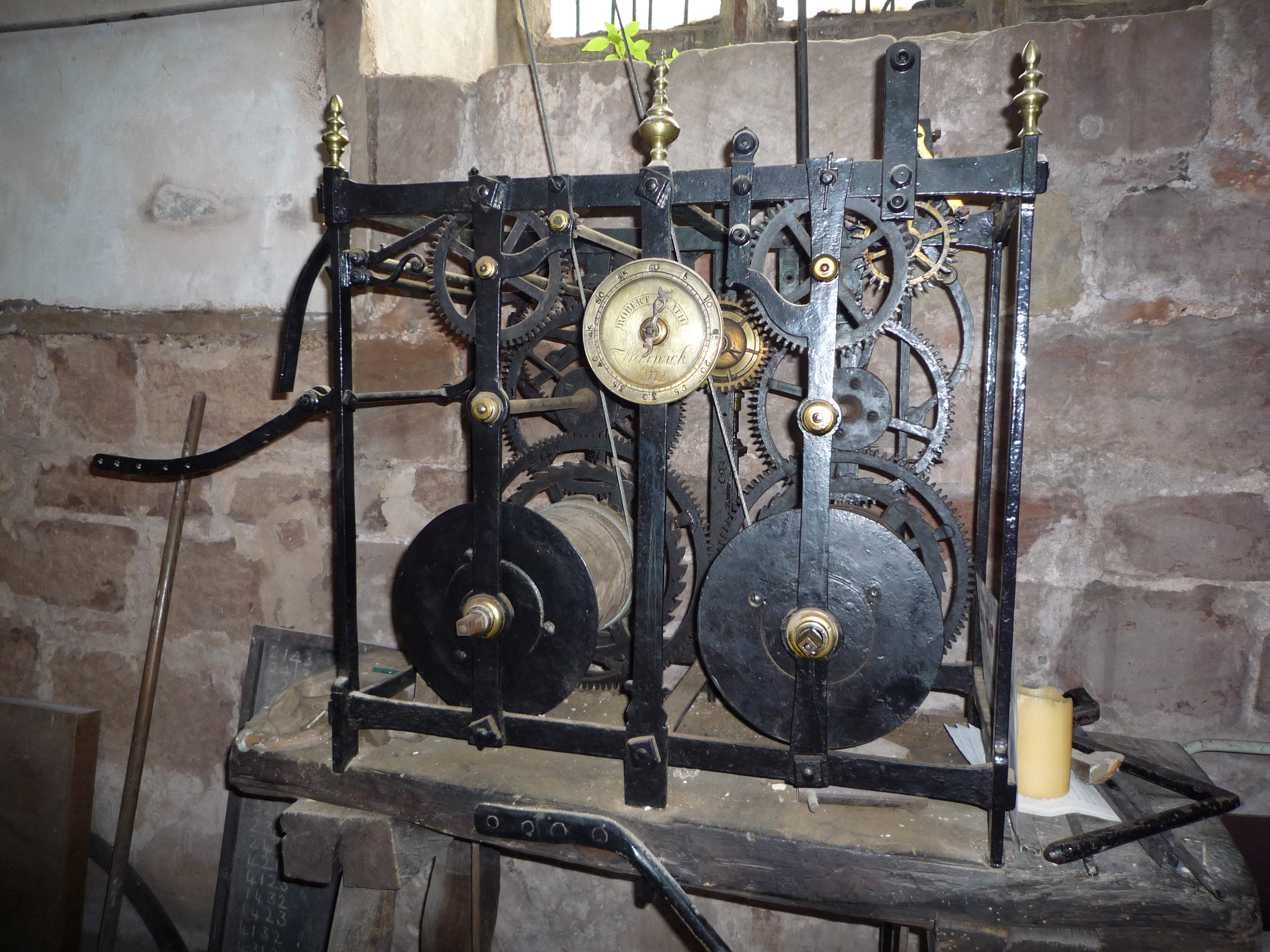
1773 turret clock in the church of St Mary the Virgin
