= Benson & Forsyth =

British architectural firm

Benson + Forsyth LLP was a British architectural partnership, whose principal architects were Gordon Benson and Alan Forsyth. Their offices were in Islington, London, although they formerly also had a small office in Edinburgh. They were nominated for the Stirling Prize in 1999 and 2002 for the Museum of Scotland and National Gallery of Ireland respectively. Their work is heavily influenced by that of Le Corbusier, but they were also interested in trying to create a more contextual form of modern architecture. The company was dissolved in 2020.

== Major projects ==
=== Completed ===
- Museum of Scotland, Edinburgh
- National Gallery of Ireland Millennium Wing, Dublin
- Gabriel Square, St Albans
- Nova Victoria, London. High end residential apartments and retail

=== Proposed ===
- Housing at The Power Station London. (Status of project uncertain as of February 2007)
- Beamish Museum visitor centre, won in competition June 2006
- City North project at Finsbury Park Station (£40 million build value).

=== Unbuilt ===
- Royal College of Surgeons of Edinburgh
- Edinburgh Central Library extension
