= University of Cambridge Primary School =

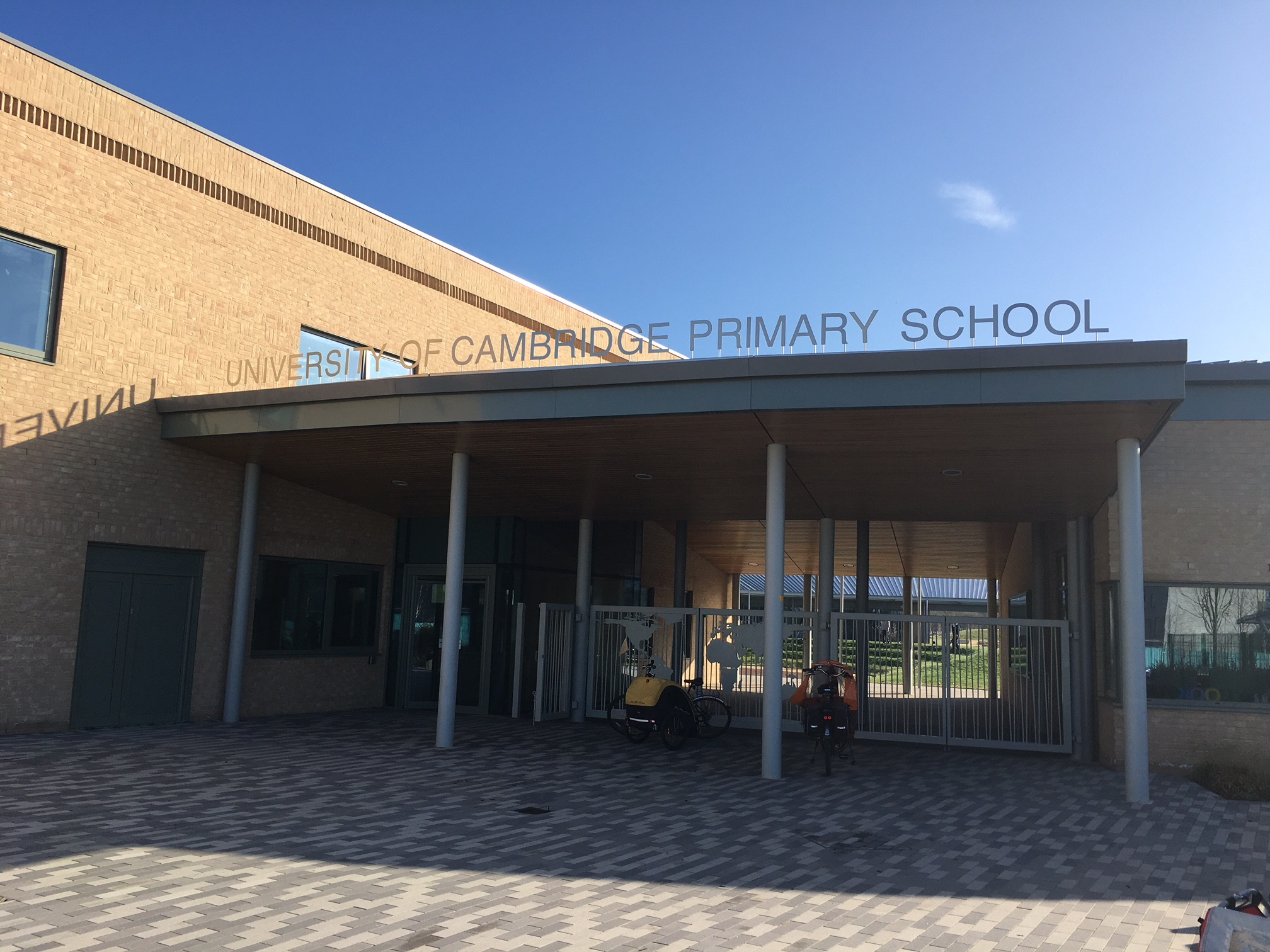

Location
- Eddington Avenue; Eddington; Cambridge, CB3 0QZ; 52.2201°N 0.0888°E

Information
- Type: Free school, laboratory school
- Established: 2015
- Department for Education URN: 141500 Tables
- Ofsted: Reports
- Headteacher: James Biddulph
- Gender: Mixed
- Age: 4 to 11
- Enrolment: 600 (2021)
- Website: http://universityprimaryschool.org.uk/

The University of Cambridge Primary School is a three-form primary school in Cambridge, UK. Funded by the local education authority, it is run as a free school by the University of Cambridge and is the first University Training School for primary in the UK. With a planned capacity of 630 pupils, the school is also used for teacher training and acts as a centre for educational research.

== History ==
Following the University's 800th anniversary in 2009, plans were formed to address the issue of the lack of affordable accommodation for its staff and post-graduate students. The 150-hectare North West Cambridge Development between Madingley Road and Huntingdon Road was identified as an area for development, and in February 2013 formal planning approval was granted for development of the site to include 1500 homes for university staff, 1500 homes for private sale, and accommodation for 2000 graduate students. To help support this, a primary school was also included in the plans, and work began on the site following a ground-breaking ceremony on 14 November 2014.

The school opened with the new school year in September 2015 with two Reception classes, one Year One class, and one Year Two class. In September 2016 three Reception classes were added. Over time the school will fill as the initial intake becomes older until there are three classes in each year up to Year Six.

== Building ==
The school was created by architects Marks Barfield, designers of the London Eye, and is circular in shape enclosing a central courtyard. Drawing inspiration from Mandy Swann's book Creating learning without limits, the school encompasses a "learning street", a central space that runs between the classrooms that themselves open directly onto the space without the need for doors. The school building received the 2017 RIBA East Award for its design and build.
