= Edward Newdegate =

British Army general

Lieutenant-General Sir Edward Newdegate KCB
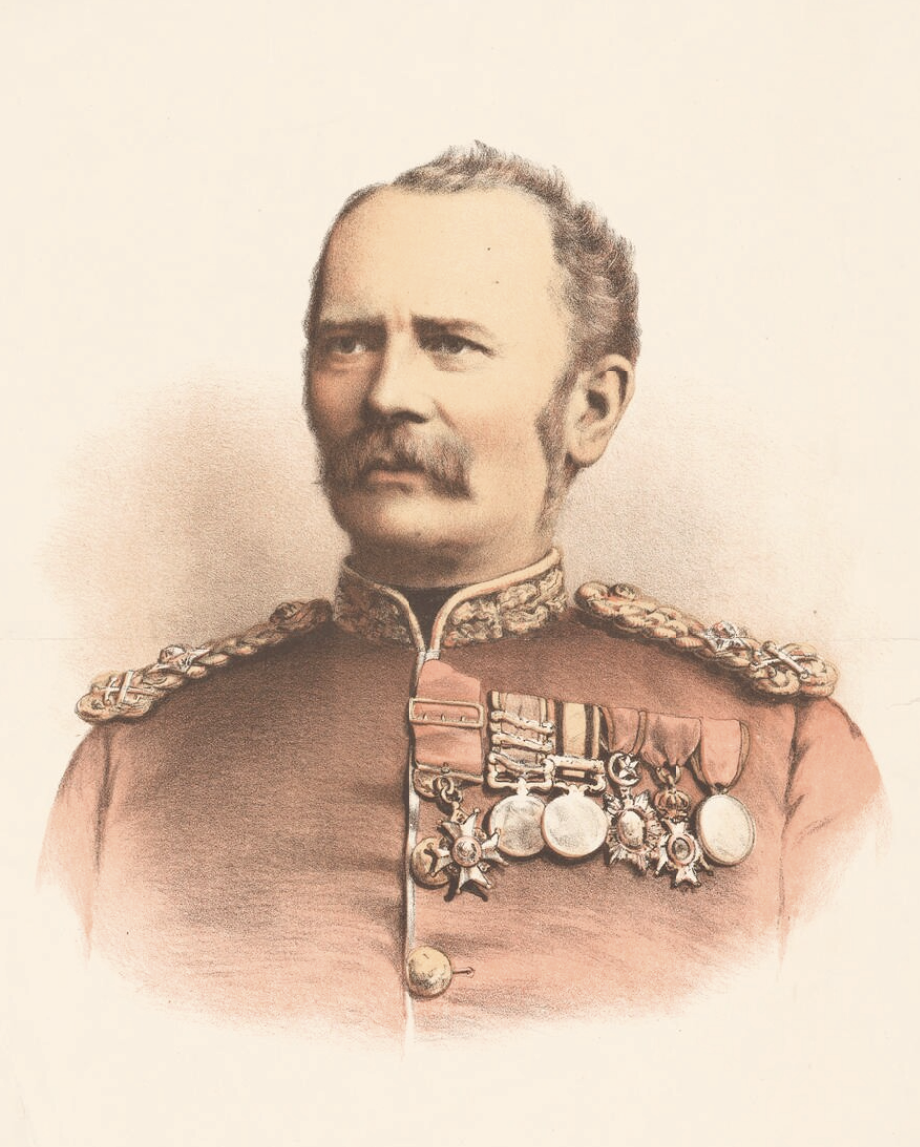
- Edward Newdigate, 1883 portrait
- Born: 15 June 1825; Astley, Warwickshire
- Died: 1 August 1902 (aged 77)
- Military career
- Allegiance: United Kingdom
- Branch: British Army
- Rank: Lieutenant-General
- Commands: South-Eastern District
- Conflicts: Anglo-Zulu War
- Awards: Knight Commander of the Order of the Bath

Lieutenant-General Sir Edward Newdigate Newdegate, KCB (15 June 1825 – 1 August 1902) was a British Army officer. Until 1887 he was Edward Newdigate.

== Background and early life ==
Newdegate was born at Astley Castle, Warwickshire, on 15 June 1825, the fourth son of Francis Newdigate, of Kirk Hallam, Derbyshire, by Lady Barbara Maria Legge (1791–1840), daughter of the 3rd Earl of Dartmouth. Lieutenant-general Sir Henry Richard Legge Newdigate (1832–1908) was a younger brother.

He was educated at the Royal Military College, Sandhurst.

== Military career ==
Newdegate was commissioned into the Rifle Brigade in 1842. He served as a captain in the Crimean War 1854–55, including the Siege of Sevastopol and was present at the Battle of Alma (Sep 1854) and at the Battle of Inkerman (Nov 1854), where he was wounded. For his services in the war, he was mentioned in despatches, received a brevet promotion to major, the Crimea Medal with three clasps, the Turkish Crimean War medal, and was awarded the knighthood of the French Legion d'Honneur and the fifth class of the Order of Medjidie. In 1861 he left the Rifle Brigade, and was employed in Canada. From 1865 to 1870 he was assistant adjutant general at Aldershot, and from 1873 to 1877 he commanded first the Carlisle Regimental district, then the Rifle Depot at Winchester. In 1878 he was appointed in command of the Chatham district, but relinquished the command the following year for active service. He served as General Officer Commanding the 2nd Division during the Anglo-Zulu War in 1879. He was appointed a Companion of the Order of the Bath (CB) for his service in the war. On his return to England, he became General Officer Commanding South-Eastern District in April 1880, serving until 1885.

After inheriting Astley Castle and the Arbury and Harefield estates of Charles Newdigate Newdegate in 1887, he took the surname Newdegate by Royal licence. Later the same year he was promoted to lieutenant-general, and the following year he became Governor of Bermuda. He held the post until retirement in 1892, and was appointed Knight Commander of the Order of the Bath (KCB) on 26 May 1894. He was a Deputy Lieutenant of Warwickshire from 27 August 1898.

He was Colonel of the Devonshire Regiment from 1897 to 1902.

== Family ==
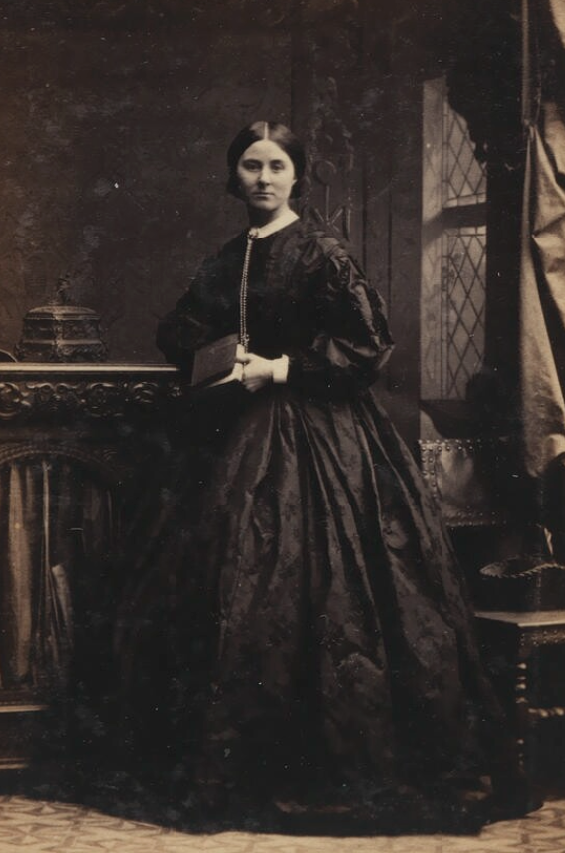
Anne Emily Newdigate, 1863 photograph

Newdigate married, in 1858, Anne Emily Garnier, daughter of Thomas Garnier, Dean of Lincoln, and his wife Lady Caroline Keppel, daughter of the 4th Earl of Albemarle. She wrote historical works: Gossip from a Muniment Room (1897) on Anne and Mary Fitton; The Cheverels of Cheverel Manor (1898), based on correspondence of Roger Newdigate and his wife, using the names under which they appear in George Eliot's Mr. Gilfil's Love Story; and Cavalier and Puritan (1901) based on the papers of Sir Richard Newdigate, 2nd Baronet.

Newdegate lived in retirement at Arbury Hall. He had both his legs amputated, first his left, and in July 1902 his right leg. This proved too much of a strain, and he died at Brighton on 1 August 1902. He was succeeded in the estates by a nephew, Francis Newdigate Newdegate.

In late 1902 a memorial table to Newdegate was placed in the church at Chilvers Coton, Warwickshire, of which he was patron.

Military offices
Preceded by Lord Alexander Russell	GOC South-Eastern District; 1880–1885	Succeeded by Percy Feilding
