= Witherford Watson Mann =

British architectural practice

Practice information
- Founders: Stephen Witherford; Christopher Watson; William Mann
- Founded: 2001; 25 years ago
- Location: London

Significant works and honors
- Buildings: Appleby Blue Almshouse, Southwark; Courtauld Connects, Westminster; River Wing, Clare College, Cambridge; Nevill Holt Opera, Leicestershire
- Projects: Astley Castle restoration, North Warwickshire
- Awards: 2013 and 2025 Stirling Prize

Website
- wwmarchitects.co.uk

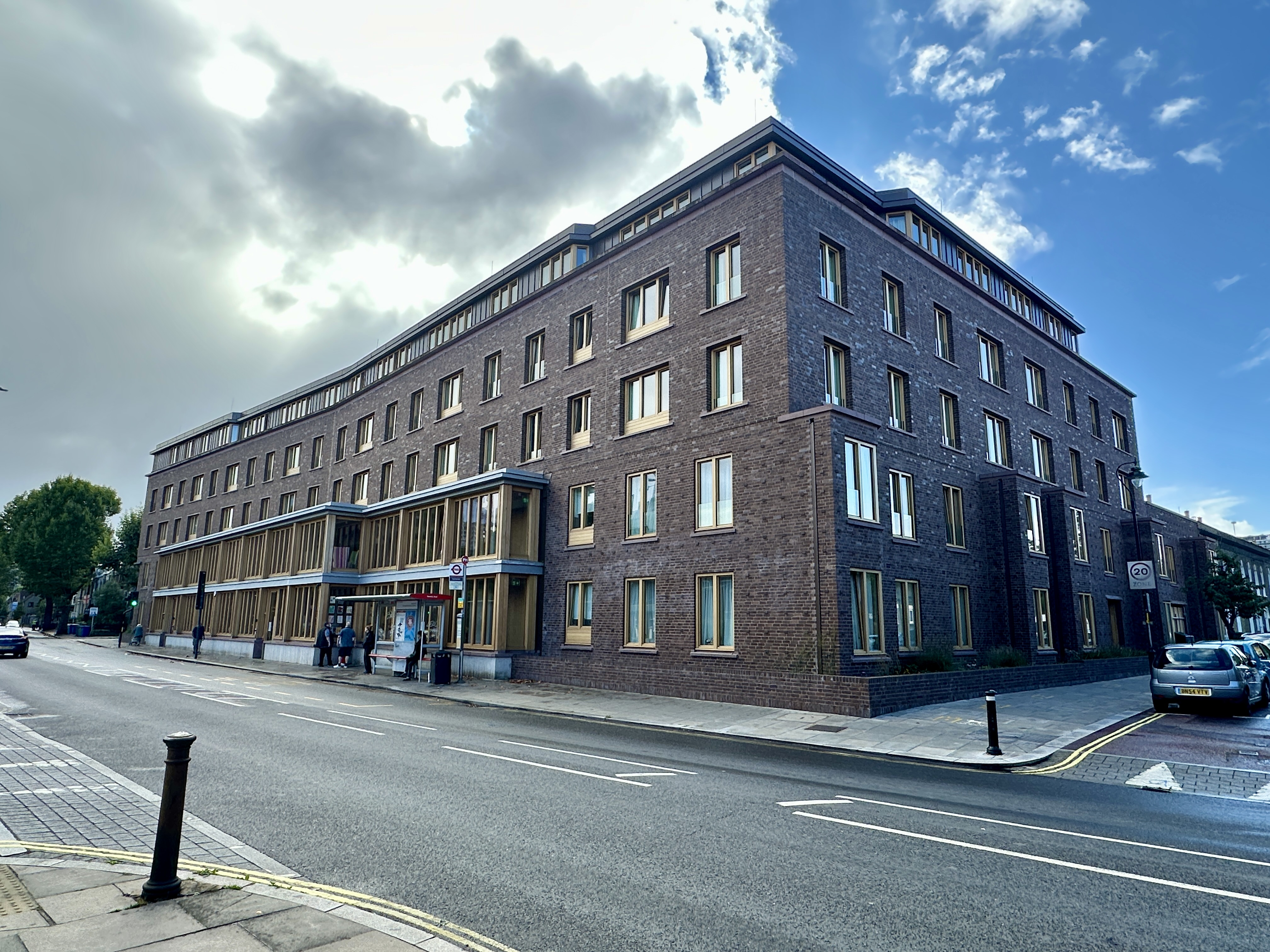
Appleby Blue Almshouse

Witherford Watson Mann is a British architectural practice founded in 2001 by Stephen Witherford, Christopher Watson and William Mann after the trio had previously studied together at Cambridge University and collaborated informally. Its first completed project was Amnesty International UK's offices and outreach facilities in London, finished in 2005. The practice has twice won the Stirling Prize, for the restoration of Astley Castle in 2013 and for the Appleby Blue Almshouse in 2025, and has been shortlisted on three further occasions for major cultural and educational projects.

== History ==
Stephen Witherford, Christopher Watson and William Mann studied together in their fifth year at Cambridge University in 1991. They began working together informally in 1997 and established Witherford Watson Mann Architects in 2001 after winning the Europan 6 competition for a site in Peckham, south London. The firm's first completed building, designed with Gregori Chiarotti Architects, was Amnesty International UK's new offices and outreach facilities in London, finished in March 2005.

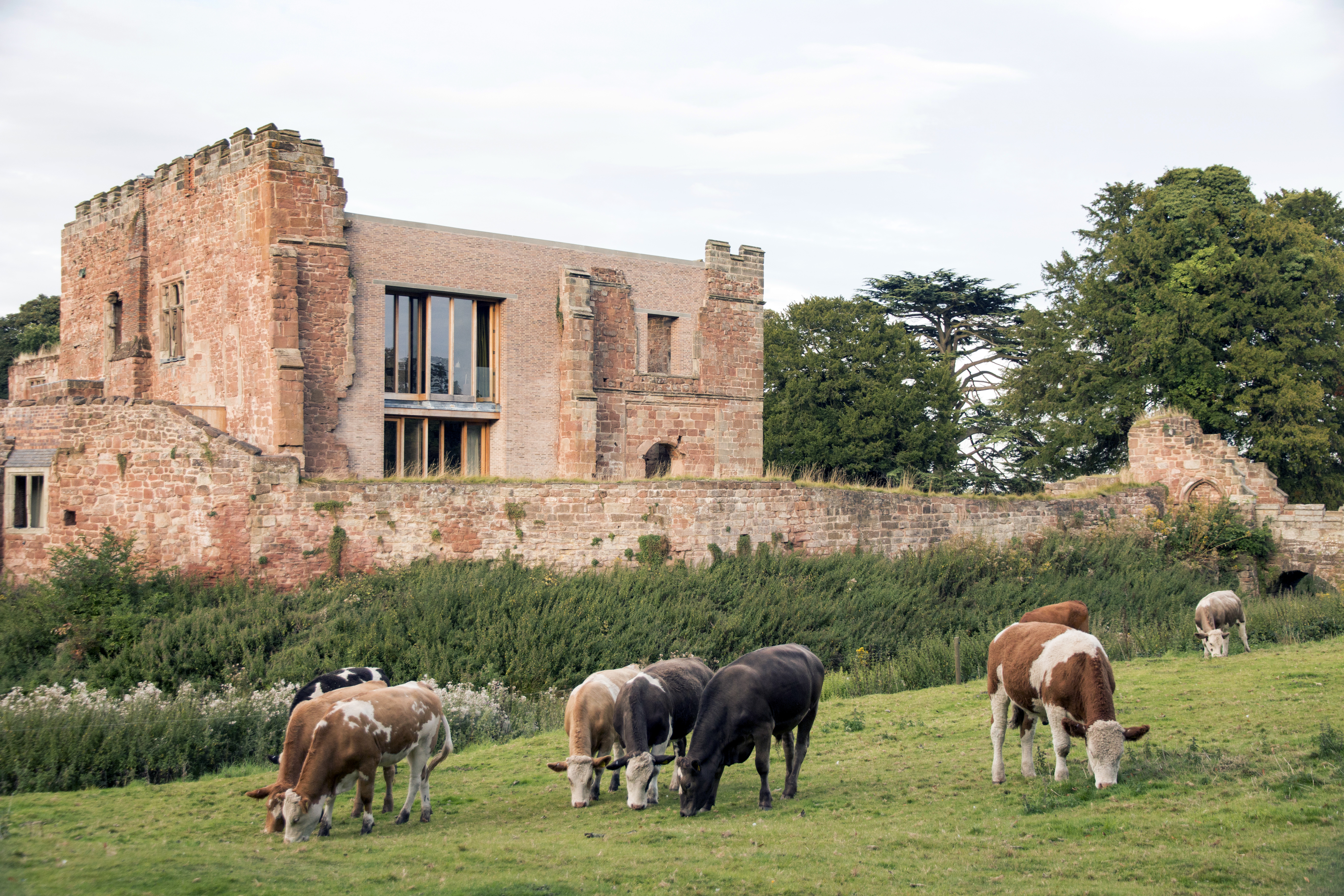
Astley Castle restoration

Witherford Watson Mann has been recognised several times by the Royal Institute of British Architects for projects involving contemporary interventions within historic or socially significant settings. The practice won the Stirling Prize in 2013 for the restoration of Astley Castle in North Warwickshire, a scheme noted for its integration of new accommodation within the remains of a medieval structure. It received the award again in 2025 for the Appleby Blue Almshouse in Southwark, London, a development providing modern almshouse accommodation within an urban site.

The practice has also been shortlisted for the Stirling Prize three times. Nevill Holt Opera in Leicestershire (2019) involved the creation of a new auditorium within a Grade II-listed stable block; Courtauld Connects in Westminster (2023) comprised the refurbishment and reorganisation of the Courtauld Gallery at Somerset House; and the River Wing of Clare College, Cambridge (2026) formed part of a wider programme of improvements to college facilities and landscape.

== Projects ==
Projects undertaken by the firm have included:

- 2024: River Wing, Clare College, Cambridge
- 2023: Appleby Blue Almshouse, Southwark
- 2022: Courtauld Connects, Westminster
- 2018: Nevill Holt Opera, Leicestershire
- 2012: Astley Castle restoration, North Warwickshire
