= Adam Lowe =

Adam Lowe may refer to:

- Adam Lowe (writer), British writer
- J. Adam Lowe, American politician
- Adam Lowe, British artist and founder of Factum Arte, an art conservation company
