= Bob Feilden =

Bob Feilden CBE FRS FREng FIMechE
- Feilden receiving his honorary Doctorate of Technology from the University of Lincoln at Lincoln Cathedral in 2003.

Personal details
- Born: Geoffrey Bertram Robert Feilden; 20 February 1917 Hampstead Garden Suburb, London, England
- Died: 1 May 2004 (aged 87)

Geoffrey Bertram Robert Feilden (20 February 1917 – 1 May 2004) was a mechanical engineer, and an important part of the Power Jets team that developed the first jet engine with Frank Whittle in the early 1940s. He was Chair of the Committee on Engineering Design from 1961 and authored the 1963 'Report of the Feilden Committee on Engineering Design'.

== Early life ==
Feilden was born in Meadway Court, Hampstead Garden Suburb, London on 20 February 1917. He was the son of Major Robert Feilden MC and Olive Binyon. He spent his early years in British Columbia, western Canada, as his father had ill health from being gassed in the First World War. He returned to England when he was eight, after his father died swimming in a lake in the Okanagan area.

He attended Heath Mount School in Hampstead, then Bedford School as a major scholar. In 1935 he worked for a year at British Thomson-Houston at Rugby (later to be the first home of Power Jets). He went to King's College, Cambridge in 1936, where he read Mechanical Sciences and Economics. In the summer holiday of 1937 he worked for Brown Boveri Company in Baden in Switzerland.

== Career ==
From 1939 to 1940 he worked for Unilever at Port Sunlight, arriving in September 1939, the very start of World War Two.

=== Power Jets ===
In 1940 he joined Power Jets, then at Rugby. He managed the engine test programme.

=== Ruston and Hornsby ===
In 1946, through an acquaintance with Geoffrey Bone, the son of Victor Bone, he went to work for Ruston & Hornsby in Lincoln. He recruited some of his former colleagues at Power Jets.

In 1954 he became the Engineering Director, having seen the TA gas turbine enter production in 1952. The first commercial turbine was sold to an oil field in Kuwait. He also designed the AT diesel engine, also for marine applications.

=== Hawker Siddeley ===
From 1959 to 1961 he worked for the gas turbine division of Hawker Siddeley (then the leading UK company in diesel engines and marine power). It was based at the former Gloster Aircraft Works at Hucclecote in Gloucestershire.

=== Davy Ashmore ===
From 1961–8 he was Group Technical Director of Davy Ashmore. This company was later bought by John Brown & Company, then Trafalgar House in 1986, Kværner in 1996, and then Aker Solutions in 2004.

=== Committee on Engineering Design ===
Feilden was Chair of the Committee on Engineering Design from 1961 to 1968. In 1963 he published his Report of the Feilden Committee on Engineering Design, commissioned by the Minister of Science. The report argued for greater importance to be placed on engineering and increased status for engineers in British design professions.

=== BSI ===
In 1968 Feilden joined the British Standards Institution as Deputy Director General, in Hemel Hempstead, becoming Director General in 1970. He worked for the BSI until 1981 as Director General.

From 1977–9 he was the President of the European Committee for Standardization. From 1967–9 he was Vice-President of the Royal Society.

== Personal life ==
Both of his wives were called Elizabeth. He married Elizabeth Gorton in 1946 and they had one son and two daughters. They divorced in 1961. In 1972 he married (Elizabeth) Diana Angier (née Lloyd), widow of Major Patrick Angier, thereby acquiring three step-children. He died in Painswick in Gloucestershire.

His son (Richard, born in 1950, and also educated at King's College, Cambridge) became an architect, and was part of the Feilden Clegg Bradley Studios practice since 1975. He died eight months after his father, in an unfortunate accident when a tree fell on him as he was creating a memorial glade to Feilden.

Feilden's daughters are Elizabeth Jane Woolmer and Fiona Ann Macaskill

Feilden's younger brother was Sir Bernard Feilden CBE, an architect (for cathedral restoration), who died in November 2008.

In 1959 he became a Fellow of the Royal Society, and was appointed a CBE in 1966. He became FREng in 1976. In 1994 he received the Hodgson Prize from the RAeS.

In 2003 The University of Lincoln awarded Feilden an honorary doctorate in technology.
