= Broadcasting tower =

Broadcasting tower can refer to

- Broadcasting Tower, Leeds - A skyscraper in Leeds, UK
- Radio masts and towers - The generic communications structure
