= Charlotte Skene-Catling =

British architect (born 1965)

- Born: October 1965 (age 60)
- Education: University of Westminster
- Occupation: Architect
- Father: Patrick Skene Catling
- Awards: RIBA House of the Year; 2015

Charlotte Merilyn Skene-Catling (born 1965) is a British architect who founded and is director of the architectural practice Skene Catling de la Peña in London, England.

The daughter of Patrick Skene Catling and Diane Skene Catling (née Wheeler-Nicholson), she was born in October 1965.

Skene-Catling studied architecture at the University of Westminster, graduating in 1992. In 2003, she and Jaime de la Peña founded London-based architectural practice "Skene Catling de la Peña" which has completed projects on sites in the United Kingdom, New York, Berlin, Moscow and Beijing. Many of her designs are informed by an approach to architecture she calls "geoarchaeology" which involves examining the geological and historical layers of a site.

As an educator she has taught architecture to postgraduate groups at the Royal College of Art and at the Karlsruhe Institute of Technology.

== Notable projects and awards ==
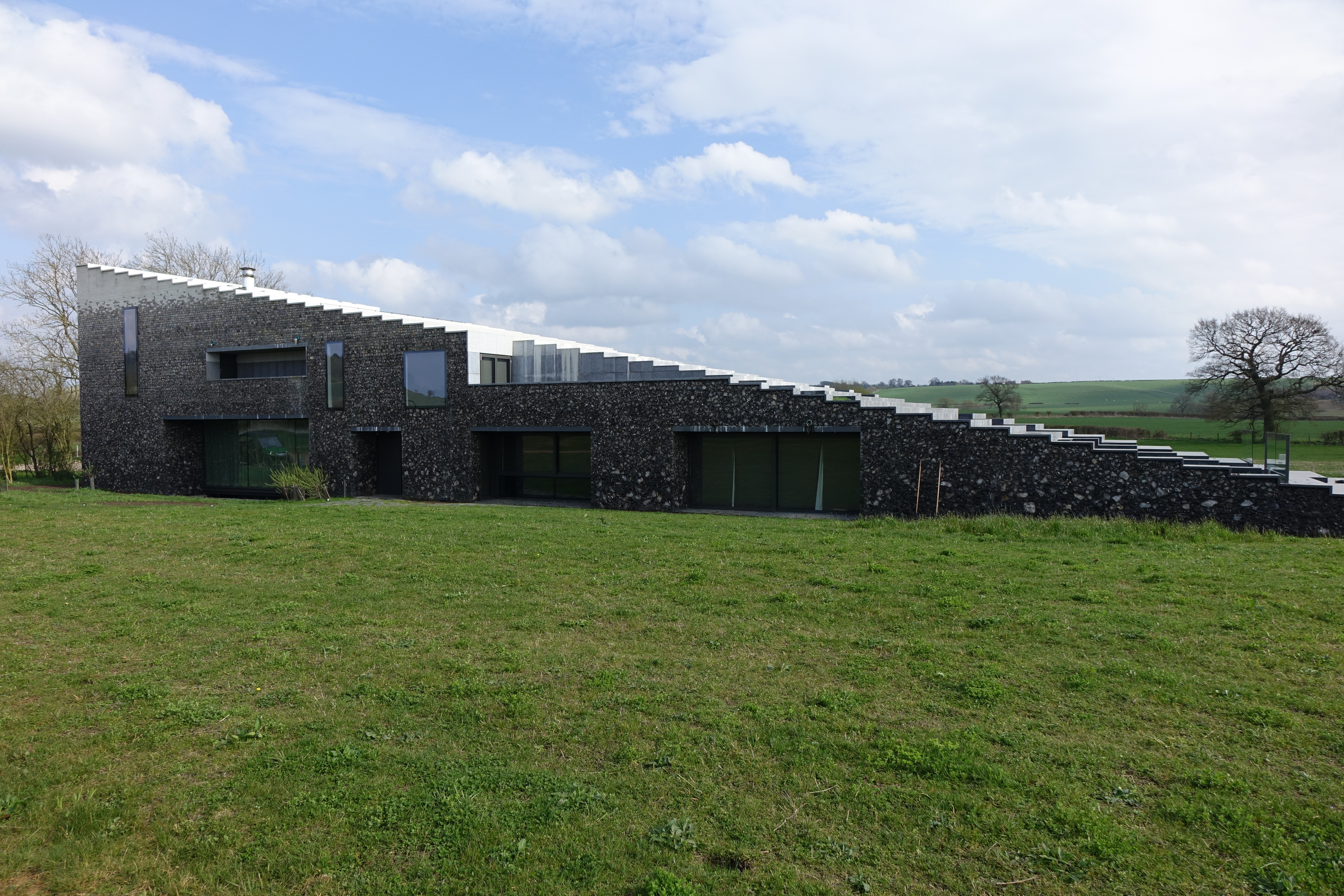
Flint House on the Waddesdon Manor estate

She was included as one of Wallpaper* magazine's "Top 50 Young Architects in the World" in 2008.

In 2015 her work on the Flint House, Buckinghamshire was recognised by the award of the RIBA House of the Year. Channel 4 featured the house as part of the Grand Designs: House of the Year series in November 2015. (Note: Featured on episode 1 and 4, with Skene-Catling appearing in episode 4)

She was shortlisted for The Architectural Review's Women in Architecture Award in 2016 and was named as one of Debrett's "500 People of Influence", under the Architecture & Design section, in both 2016 and 2017. Skene-Catling and Manuel Toledo-Otaegui created the first film festival in the United Kingdom dedicated to the topics of film and architecture; the Arch Film Fest was first held in 2017.

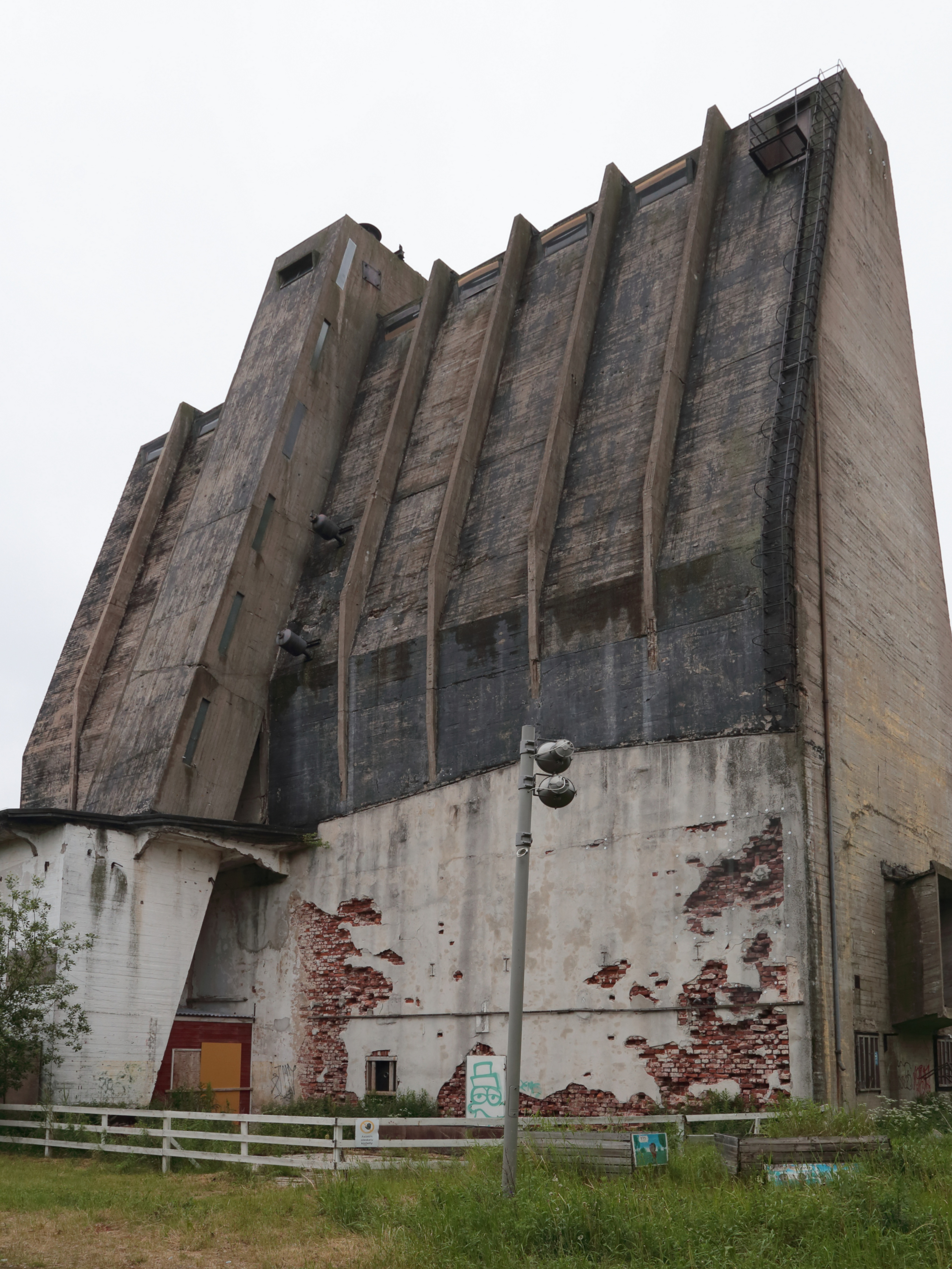
The Toppila woodchip silo in 2021

Skene-Catling embarked on a collaboration in 2020 with the Factum Foundation, which had been setup by Adam Lowe (Skene-Catling's husband and the founder of Factum Arte), to purchase the 28-metre-high (92 ft) wood chip silo at Toppila, Finland so that it could be repurposed into a performance, exhibition and event space. The silo, which was erected in 1931 and was voted “the ugliest building in Oulu” in a public poll in 2009, was the first industrial building designed by Alvar and Aino Aalto, it is now designated and protected by the Finnish Heritage Agency as a nationally important protected building.

== Personal life ==
Skene-Catling was engaged to Malcolm McLaren in the 1990s, they collaborated on writing projects, film scripts and on design for men's and women's fashion wear.

In 2016 she married the artist Adam Lowe, founder of Factum Arte.
