= Maccreanor Lavington =

Architectural design firm

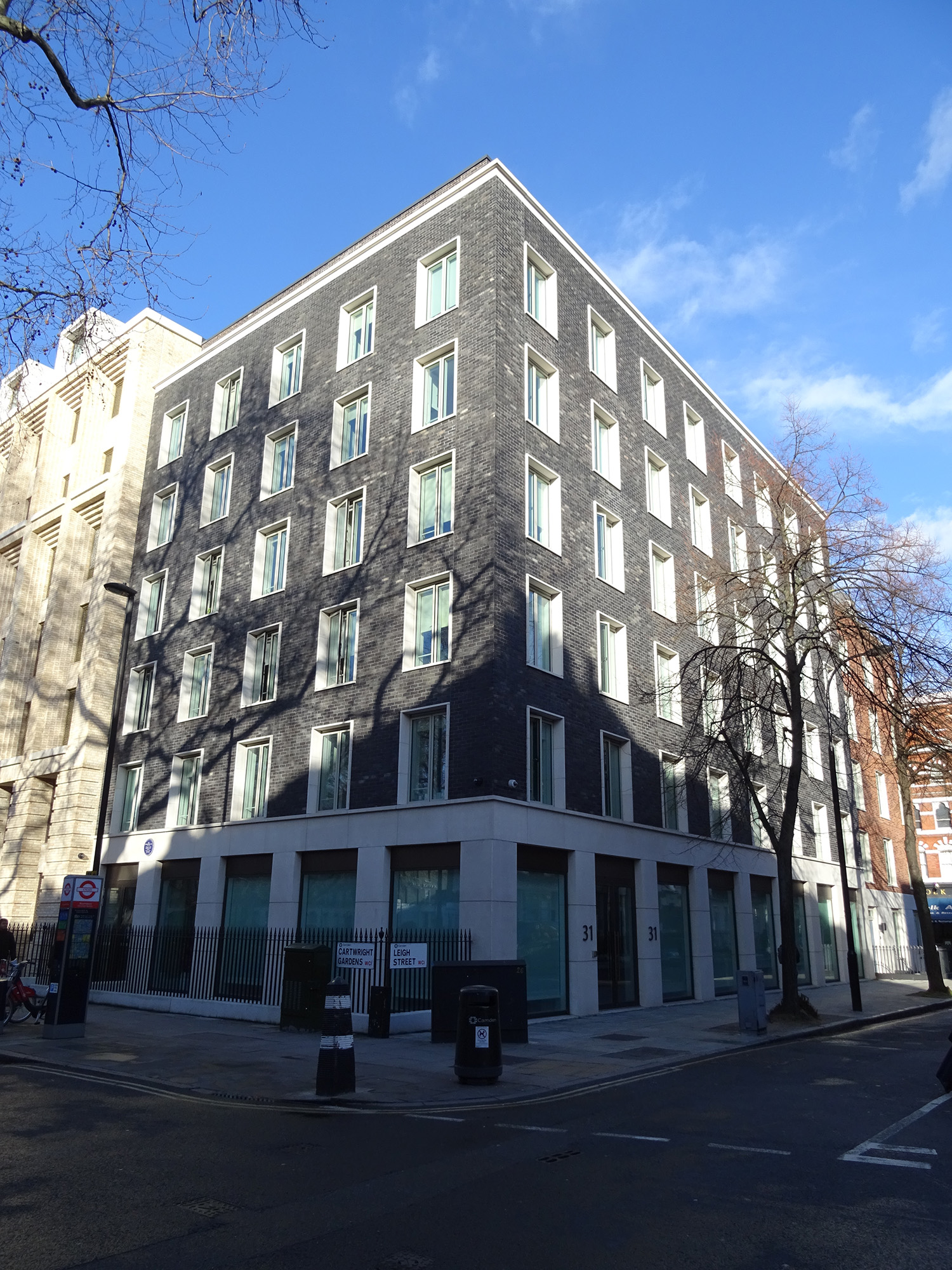

Practice information
- Key architects: Gerard Maccreanor; Richard Lavington
- Founded: 1992
- Location: Rotterdam, Netherlands; London, United Kingdom

Significant works and honors
- Buildings: Accordia
- Awards: Stirling Prize (2008) RIBA European Award (2013, 2014) RIBA London Award (2018)

Website
- www.maccreanorlavington.com

Maccreanor Lavington is a British architectural design firm with offices in Rotterdam and London, known for its work in housing, public buildings and regeneration.

The firm was formed in 1992 in Rotterdam by architects Gerard Maccreanor and Richard Lavington, and currently employs around 40 architects in London, as well as around 40 architects overseas.

In 2008, Accordia, which was also designed by Alison Brooks Architects and Feilden Clegg Bradley Studios, became the first housing development to win the Royal Institute of British Architects (RIBA) Stirling Prize.

In 2021, Maccreanor Lavington was nominated for Neave Brown Award for its Blackfriars Circus scheme in London. The contract value of the project is £105m. Internal area is 39,467m².

== Selected works ==
- Accordia, Cambridge
- South Gardens, London
- North West Cambridge development, Cambridge
- Saxon Court & Roseberry Mansions, Kings Cross, London
- Katendrecht, Rotterdam
- Kraaiennest Metro Station, Amsterdam
- One Cartwright Gardens, London

== Gallery ==
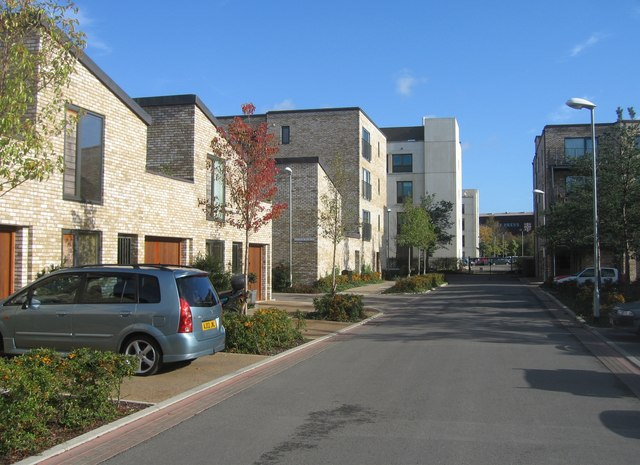
Accordia, Cambridge

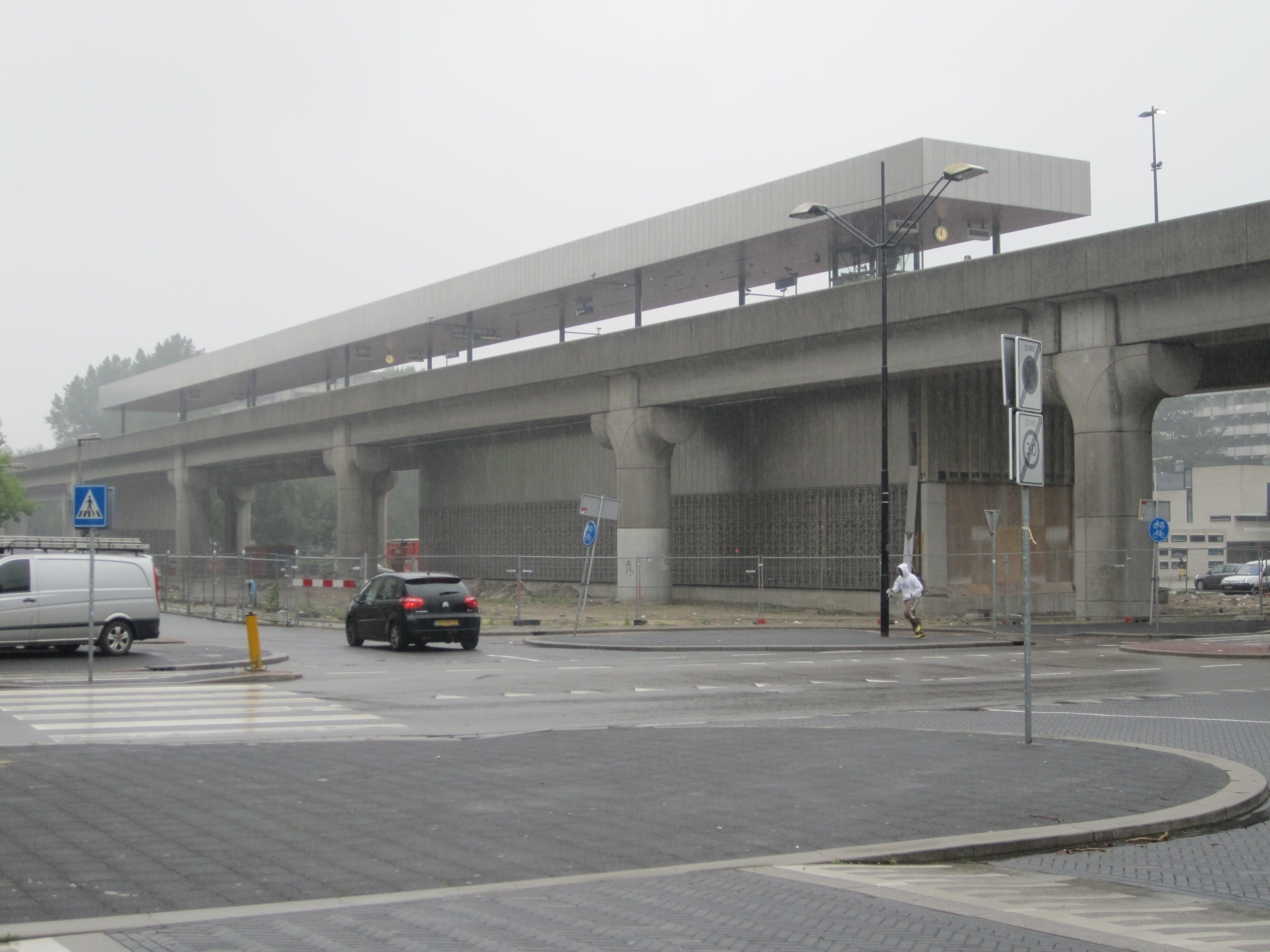
Kraaiennest Metro Station, Amsterdam

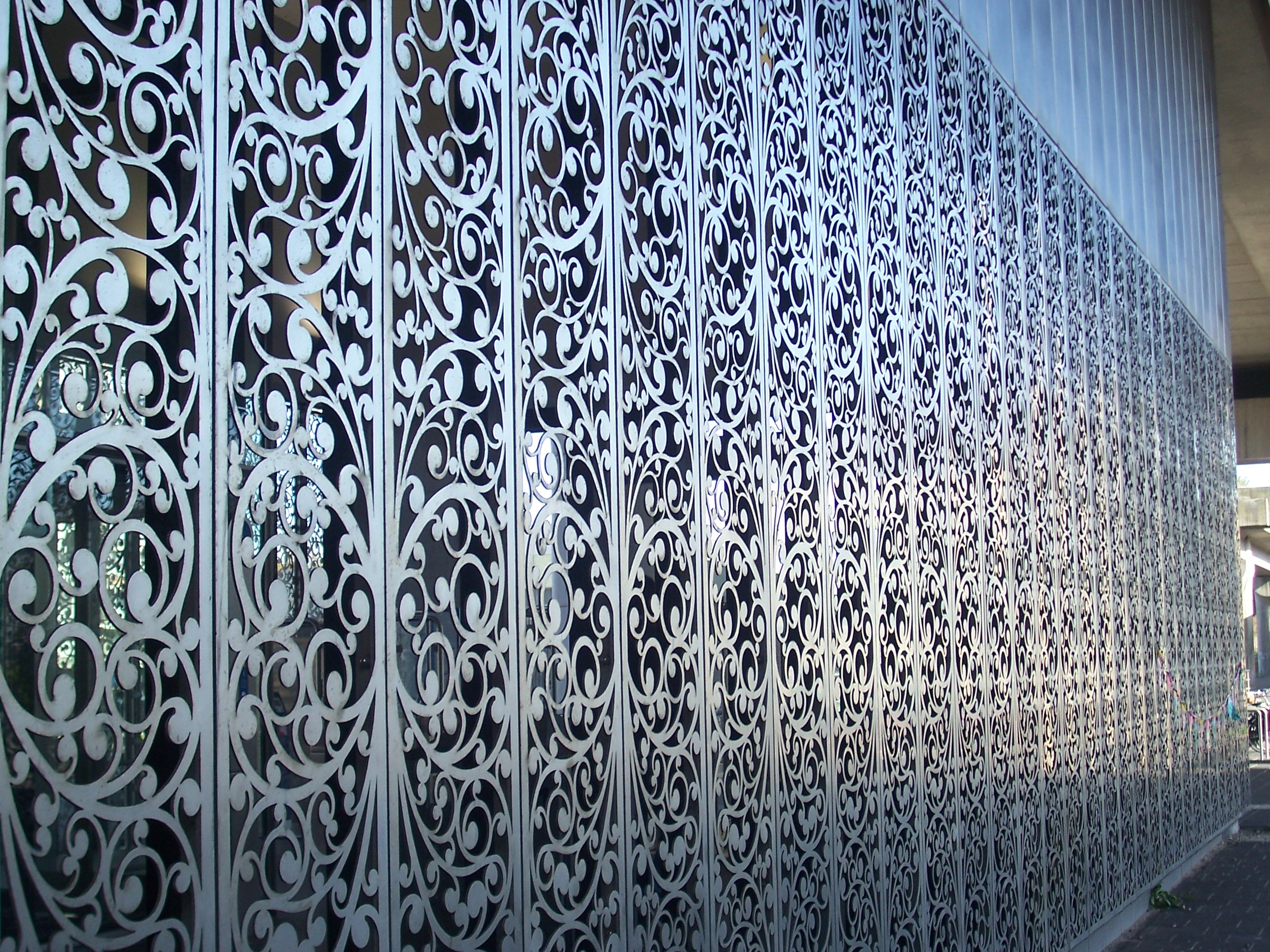
Kraaiennest Metro Station, Amsterdam

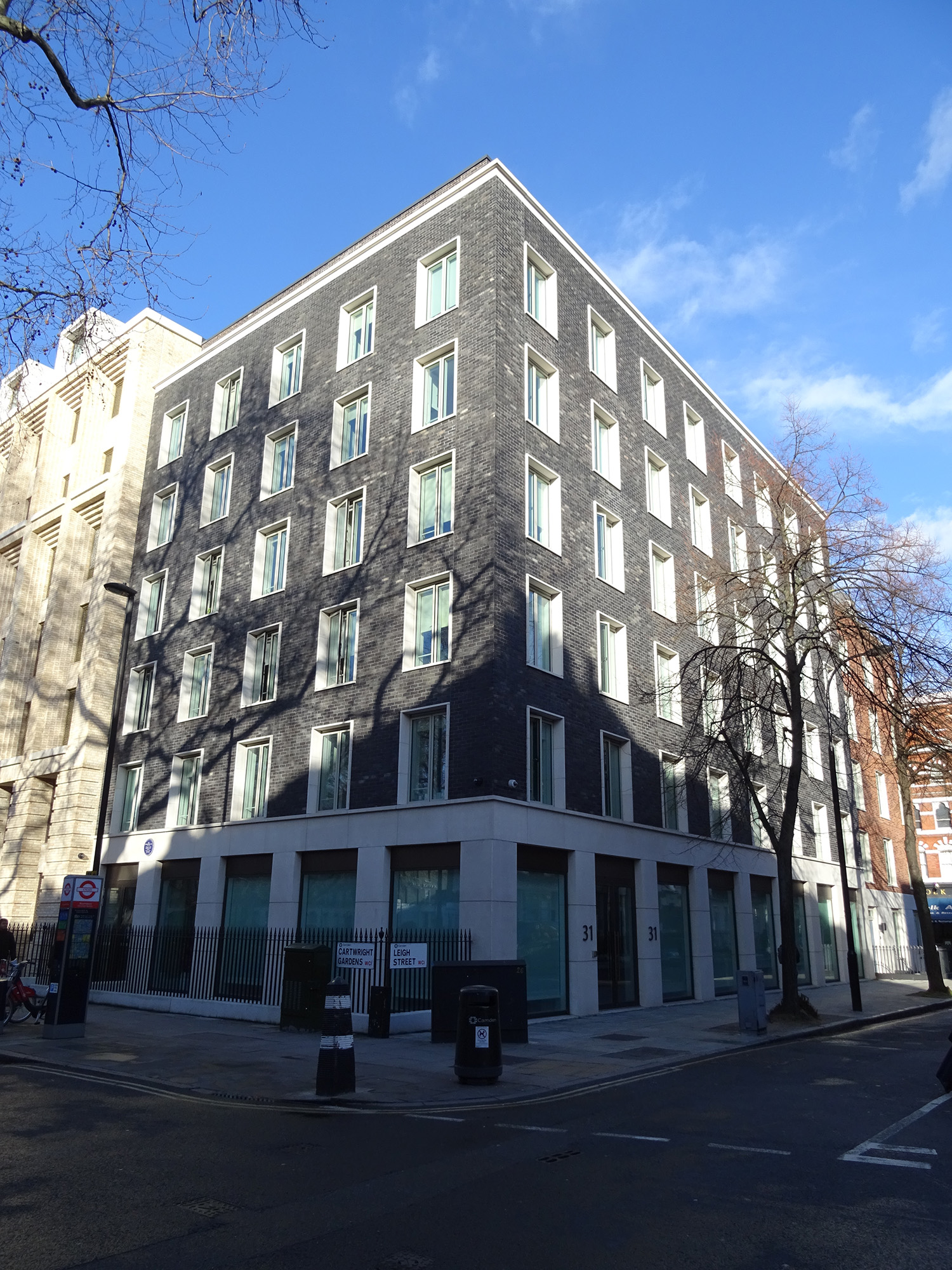
Cartwright Gardens, London

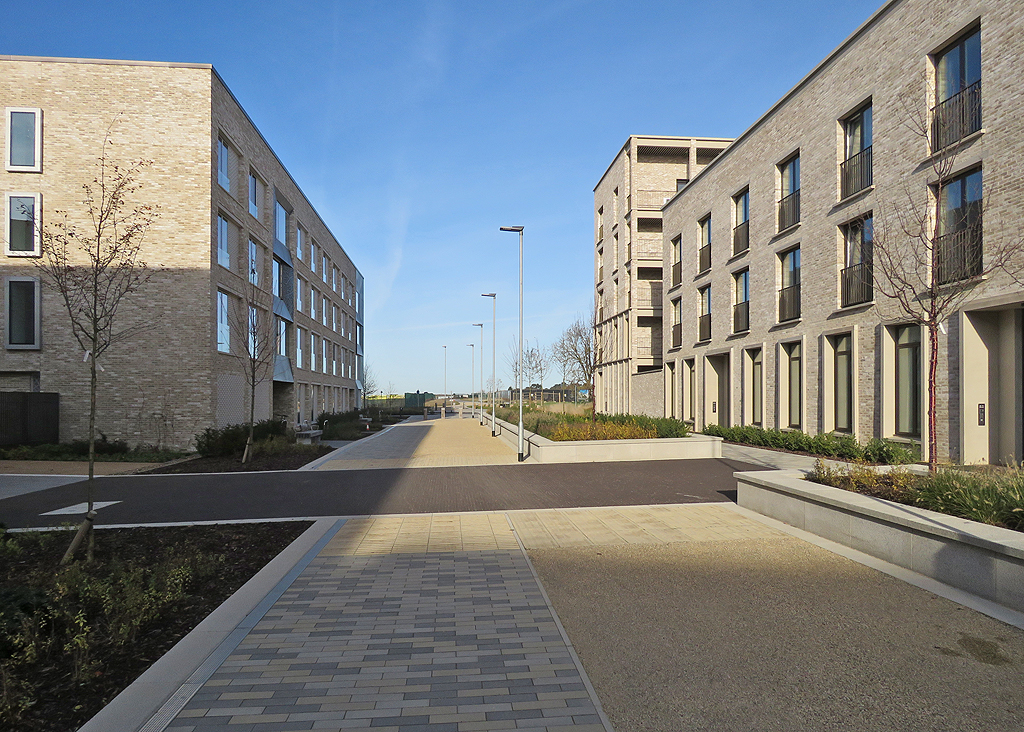
North West Cambridge
