= Richard Feilden =

British architect (1950–2005)

- Born: 29 March 1950; Lincoln, England
- Died: 3 January 2005 (aged 54); Warleigh, Wiltshire
- Education: Cambridge University; Architectural Association
- Occupation: Architect
- Awards: OBE (1999)
- Practice: Feilden Clegg

Richard John Robert Feilden OBE (29 March 1950 – 3 January 2005) was a British architect who co-founded Feilden Clegg Architects.

== Life and work ==
Feilden was born in Lincoln on 29 March 1950. His father, Bob Feilden, was an engineer who served as the Director General of the British Standards Institution from 1970 to 1981. His uncle Bernard Feilden was a conservation architect. Richard Feilden changed his university studies from engineering to architecture, graduating from Cambridge University, followed by further studies at the Architectural Association.

In 1978 he set up his own architecture practice in Bath, Somerset, with fellow architect Peter Clegg: now Feilden Clegg Bradley Studios. The practice specialised in designing and constructing low-energy housing. He built his own house in Warleigh, Wiltshire.

He was known to be outspoken, honest and critical of the problems with building design and wider issues, such as global sustainability. He argued that head teachers should be centrally involved in the design of their schools and criticised the mediocrity of school design. According to architect Sunand Prasad, Feilden's greatest achievement was to form Feilden Clegg into "a modern form of practice that explicitly embraces the collaborative nature of producing architecture."

In 1998 he became part of Lord Rogers' Urban Task Force and, in 2000, was appointed to the Commission for Architecture and the Built Environment.

Feilden was accidentally killed in Warleigh on 3 January 2005, when a tree fell on him while he was clearing a patch of woodland as a memorial to his father, who had died eight months earlier. In tribute the 2005 RIBA President, George Ferguson, said of Feilden: "He showed that good architecture needn't be showy or iconic. What is great about his practice is that, although Richard led from the front, it wasn't reliant on one single person. They're the one firm we lose to graciously."

== Personal life ==
Feilden married Patricia "Tish" Nielson in 1975. They had three children.

== Richard Feilden Foundation ==
In 2005, the Richard Feilden Foundation was set up in his memory. The charity is a network of professionals, with expertise of the built environment and education sectors who provide skills and transfer knowledge to enhance educational infrastructure across Africa. It partners with like-minded organisations and individuals to collaborate on building education projects in Africa.
