= Leventis Gallery =

Coordinates: 35.1694°N 33.3585°E

The Leventis Gallery Λεβέντειος Πινακοθήκη
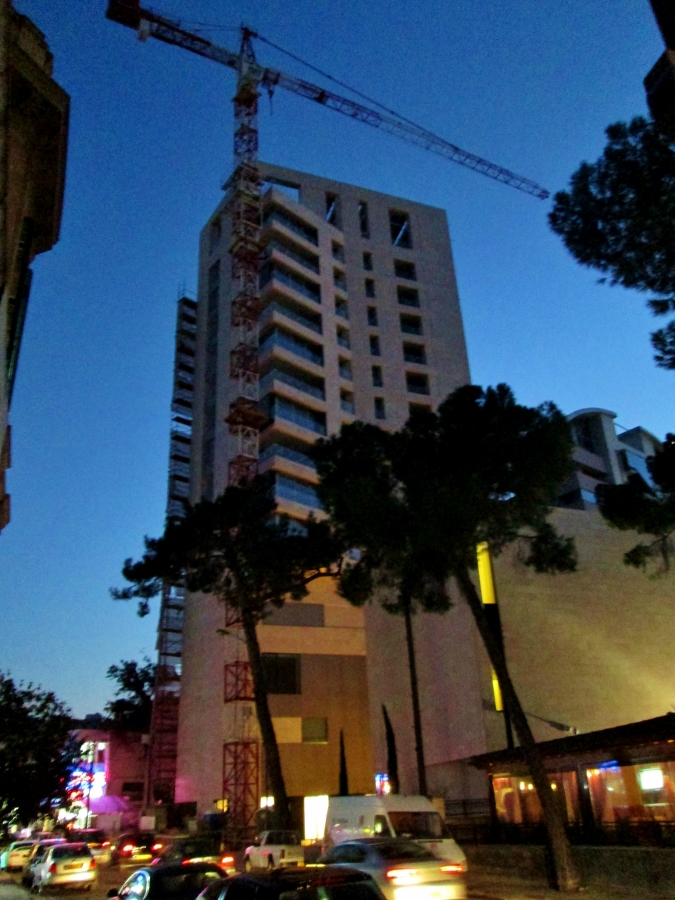
- Established: 2014
- Location: 5 Leonidou street, 1097, Nicosia, Cyprus
- Type: Art gallery

The Leventis Gallery is an art gallery in Nicosia, Cyprus. Opened in 2014, it houses a collection of over 800 paintings from Cypriot, Greek and European artists. An International architectural design competition was launched by RIBA Competitions to design the art gallery with restaurant and housing for the A. G. Leventis Foundation, a private foundation supporting educational, cultural and philanthropic causes mainly in Cyprus and Greece and promoting Hellenic culture. Following this competition Feilden Clegg Bradley Studios were selected and the project was completed in Jan. 2013.

== Collections ==
=== The Greek collection ===
The Greek Collection includes works by artists from the 19th and 20th centuries.

=== The Paris collection ===
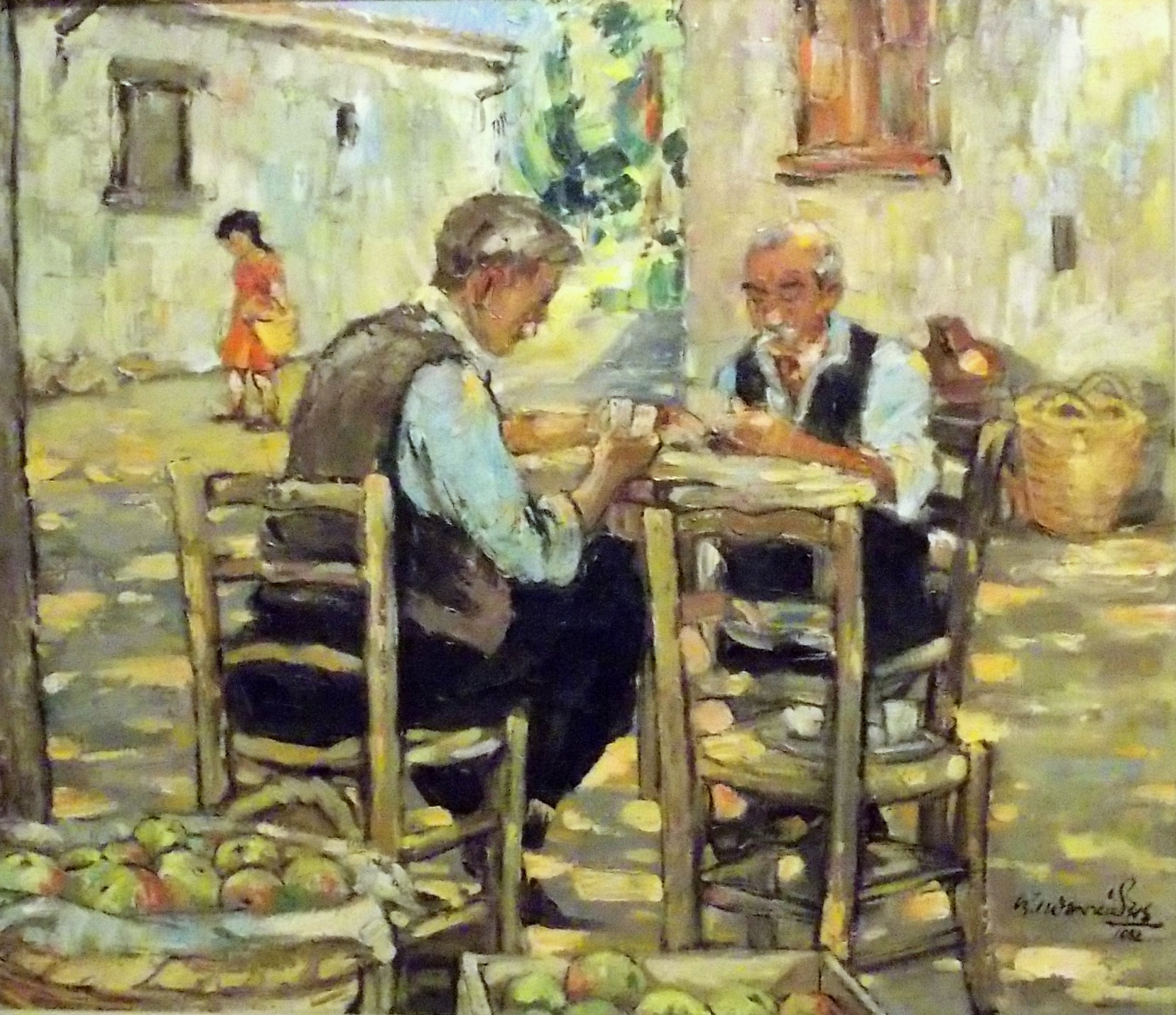
"Card Players", an oil on canvas by Victor Ioannides (1903-1984)

The Paris Collection includes works by important European artists of the 17th to the 20th century. Works by Canaletto, François Boucher, Fragonard, Corot, Boudin, Renoir, Monet, Signac and Chagall are on public display.

=== The Cyprus collection ===
The Cyprus Collection includes works of art by Cypriot artists since 1900.
