= RIBA House of the Year =

The RIBA House of the Year, formerly the Manser Medal is an award given annually by the Royal Institute of British Architects for "the best new house designed by an architect in the UK".

In 2001, Architects' Journal inaugurated the annual Manser Medal, named after Michael Manser, to recognise the best completed house in the UK. It was rebranded as the RIBA House of the Year in 2015.

== Selected winners ==
- 2024: Six Columns by 31/44 Architects
- 2023: Green House by Hayhurt & Co.
- 2022: The Red House by David Kohn Architects
- 2021: House on the Hill by Alison Brooks Architects
- 2019: House Lessans, by McGonigle McGrath
- 2018: Lochside House, by HaysomWardMiller Architects
- 2017: Caring Wood, by James Macdonald Wright and Niall Maxwell
- 2016: The Murphy House, Edinburgh, by Richard Murphy- see also longlist
- 2015: Flint House, Buckinghamshire by Charlotte Skene-Catling
- 2014: Stormy Castle, Gower peninsula, by Loyn & Co
