= Manuel Franquelo =

Spanish painter and sculptor (1953–2024)

Manuel Franquelo (Spanish pronunciation: [manˈwel fɾaŋˈke.lo]; 1953 – 28 May 2024) was a Spanish painter and mixed media sculptor.

== Biography ==
Franquelo was born in Málaga in 1953. He established his reputation as a hyper-realist painter. A common theme in his paintings is a collection of still life objects arranged on a shelf against a dark background.

From the late 1990s Franquelo worked and collaborated with Adam Lowe and engineer Sven Nebel. Lowe and Franquelo created the Factum Arte studio together in 2001, and Franquelo was involved with the studio until 2004. With the support of Factum Arte and Factum Foundation, Franquelo created the Lucida 3D Scanner, used to record three-dimensional images of low-relief surfaces such as those of paintings and frescoed wall surfaces, and still in use by Factum in 2020. Franquelo trained as an electronic engineer, and subsequently produced installations and sculptures often incorporating electronics or computer control.

In 2001, Franquelo and Lowe contributed to a project, along with the Egyptian Supreme Council of Antiquities, Ahmad Baghat and Michael Mallinson, to demonstrate that it was possible to laser-scan and replicate the tomb of Seti I in the Valley of the Kings. This led to the later recording by Factum Arte and Factum Foundation of the Tomb of Thutmose III, the tomb of Tutankhamun, and the tomb of Seti I.

Franquelo died in Madrid on 28 May 2024, at the age of 71.
