= Feilden Clegg Bradley Studios =

British architectural firm

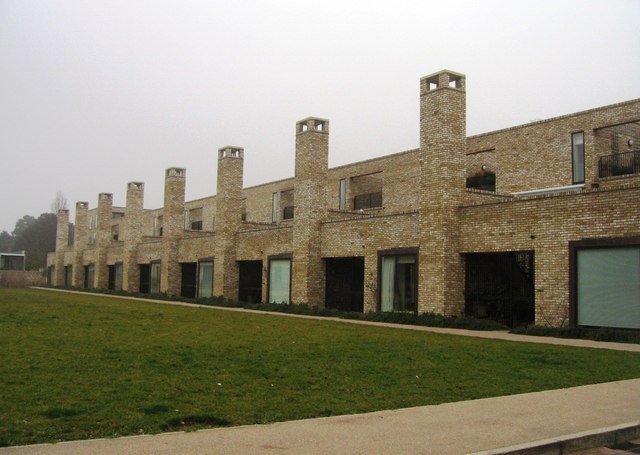
- Accordia was the first housing development to win the Stirling Prize

Practice information
- Partners: Peter Clegg, Keith Bradley, David Stansfield, Geoff Rich, Ian Taylor, Andy Theobald, Simon Doody, Alex Whitbread, Sara Grohmann, Hugo Marrack, Mike Keys, David Appel, Richard Collis, Rachel Sayers, Fliss Childs, Anja Grossmann, Colin Cobb, Marcus Rothnie, George Wilson, Kossy Nnachetta, Chris Allen, Alina White, Alice Laws
- Founders: Richard Feilden, Peter Clegg
- Founded: 1978 as Feilden Clegg Design
- Location: Bath, London, Manchester

Significant works and honors
- Buildings: Accordia Housing, Cambridge; National Trust Headquarters; The Hive, Worcester; Manchester School of Art; Plymouth School of Creative Arts; Faculty of Arts, University of Warwick
- Awards: 2008 Stirling Prize

Website
- fcbstudios.com

Feilden Clegg Bradley Studios (also known as FCBStudios) is a British architectural practice established in 1978, with offices in Bath, London and Manchester. The firm is noted for its work in sustainable design and has undertaken projects across education, housing and urban design.

In 2008 it won the RIBA Stirling Prize for Accordia in Cambridge, designed in collaboration with Alison Brooks Architects and Maccreanor Lavington. The practice was subsequently shortlisted for the prize in 2014 for Manchester School of Art and in 2023 for the Faculty of Arts at the University of Warwick in Coventry. Of British architectural practices, FCBS has won the most RIBA Awards - 71 in total.

== History ==
The company was formed in 1978 by architects Richard Feilden (1950–2005) and Peter Clegg, initially operating from small premises in Bath, Somerset. The practice's early work focused on low-energy housing, and over the following two decades it received awards for a number of school design projects, gaining "a formidable reputation in the education sector". As the practice expanded to more than 100 staff, it developed an "unusually democratic" way of operating.

Feilden was killed in an accident in 2005, after which the practice continued under Peter Clegg and senior partner Keith Bradley. In 2008 the firm, together with Alison Brooks Architects and Maccreanor Lavington, won the RIBA Stirling Prize for Accordia, a high-density housing development in Cambridge.

Peter Clegg was part of the steering group that launched the Architects Declare initiative in 2019, which seeks to address the construction industry's impact on the climate crisis and biodiversity loss. He was appointed OBE for services to architecture in the 2025 New Year Honours.

Feilden Clegg Bradley Studios has offices in Bath, London and Manchester, and works across sectors including education, housing and urban design, with particular expertise in heritage, retrofit and low‑carbon architecture.

== Notable projects ==
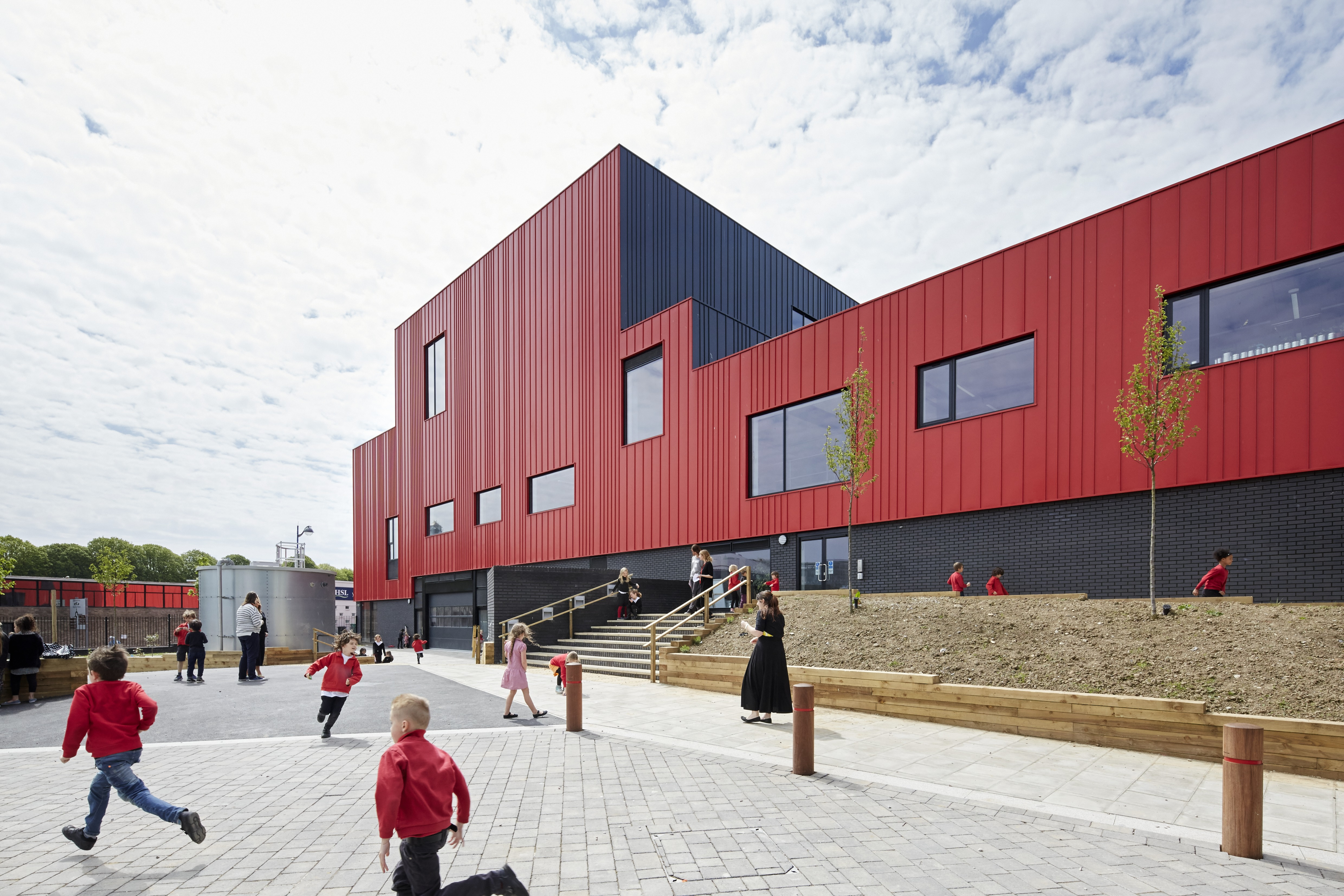
Plymouth School of Creative Arts

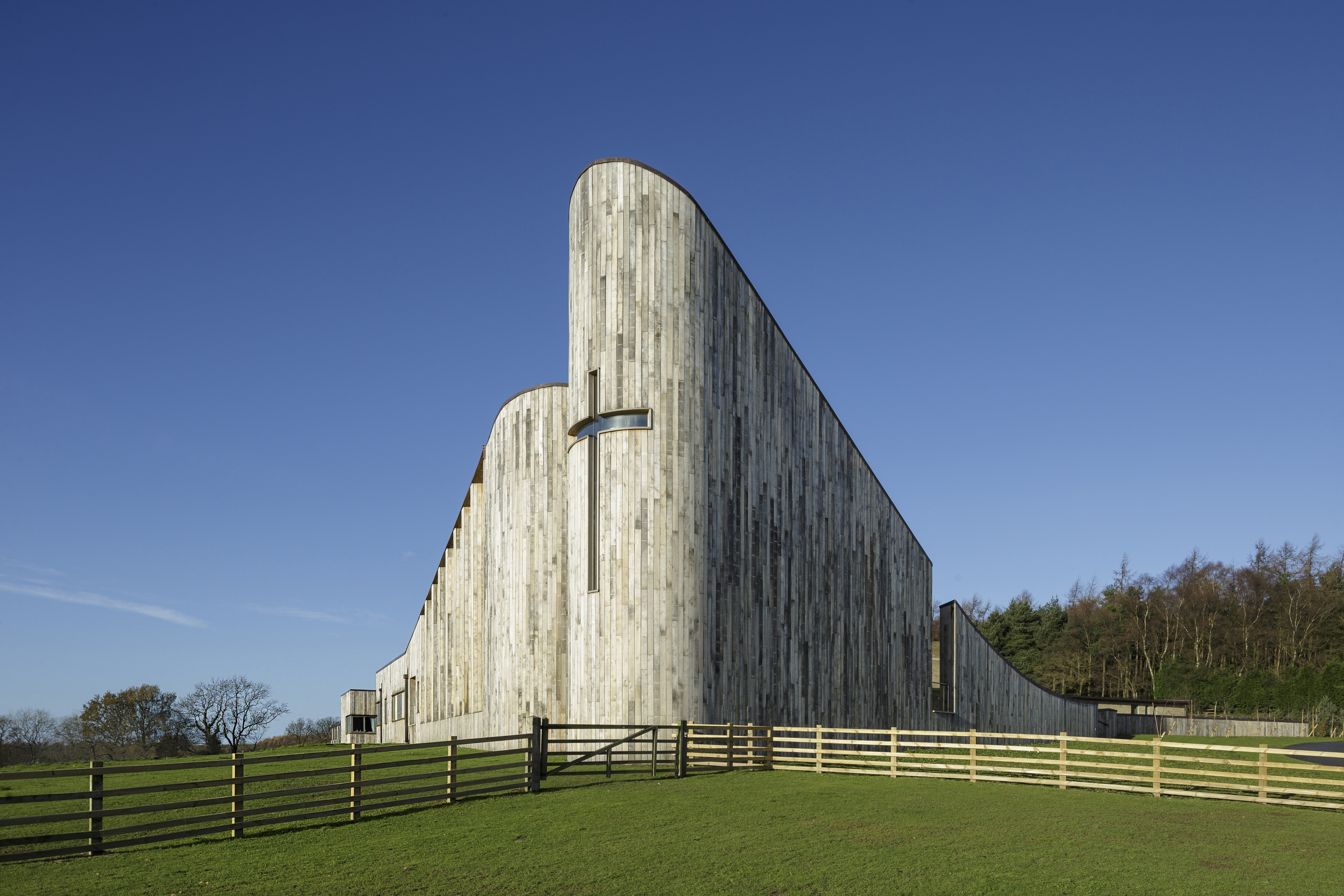
Stanbrook Abbey

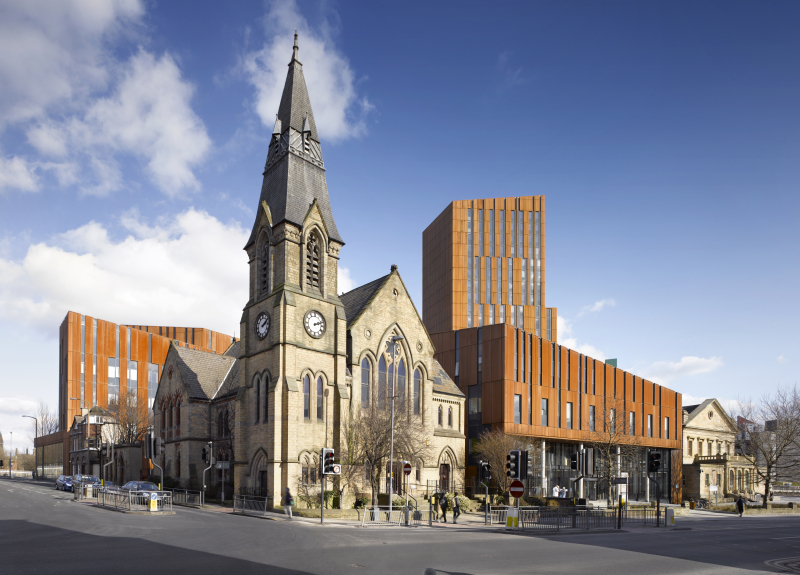
Broadcasting Place, Leeds

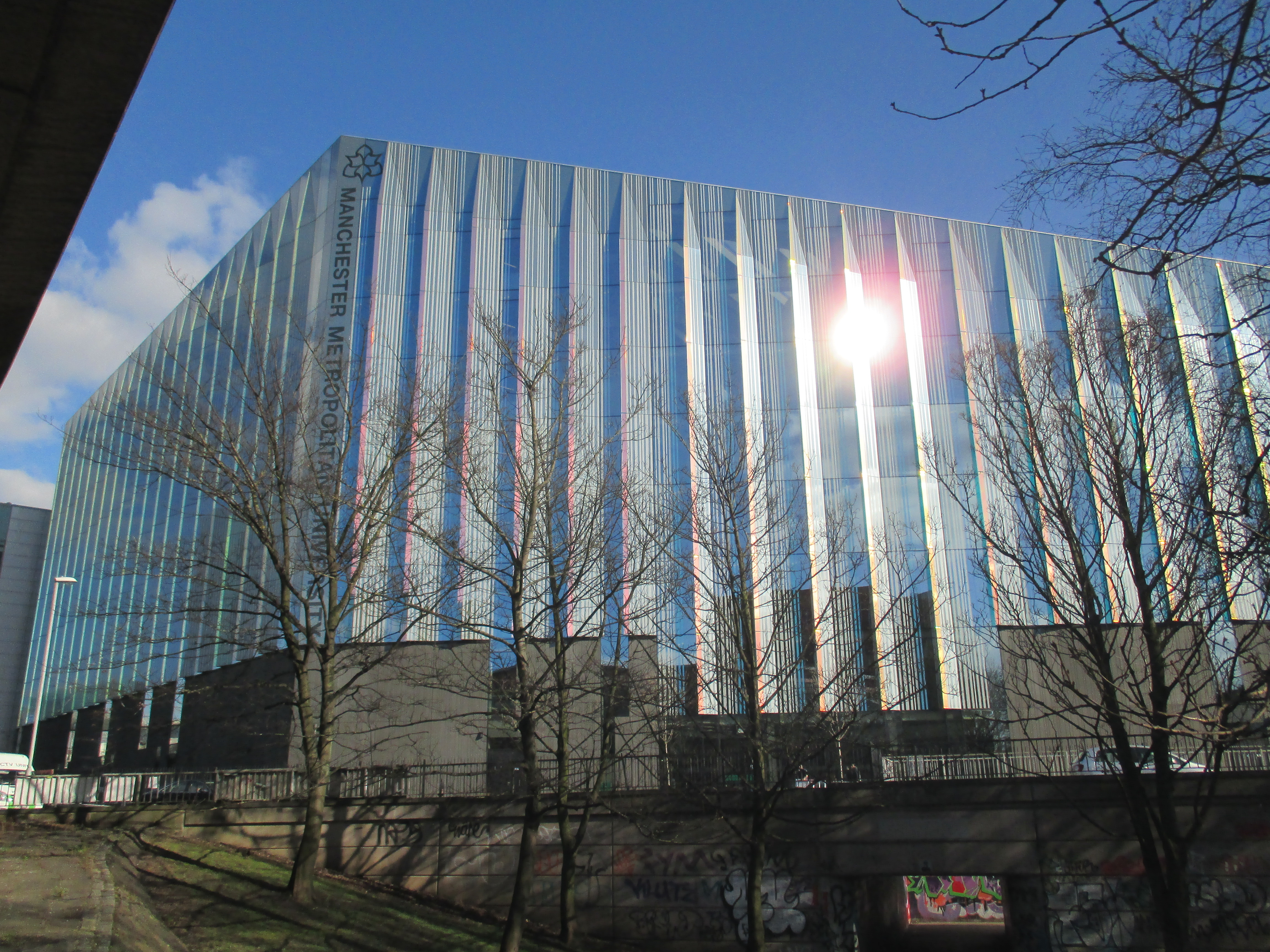
Manchester Metropolitan University Business School

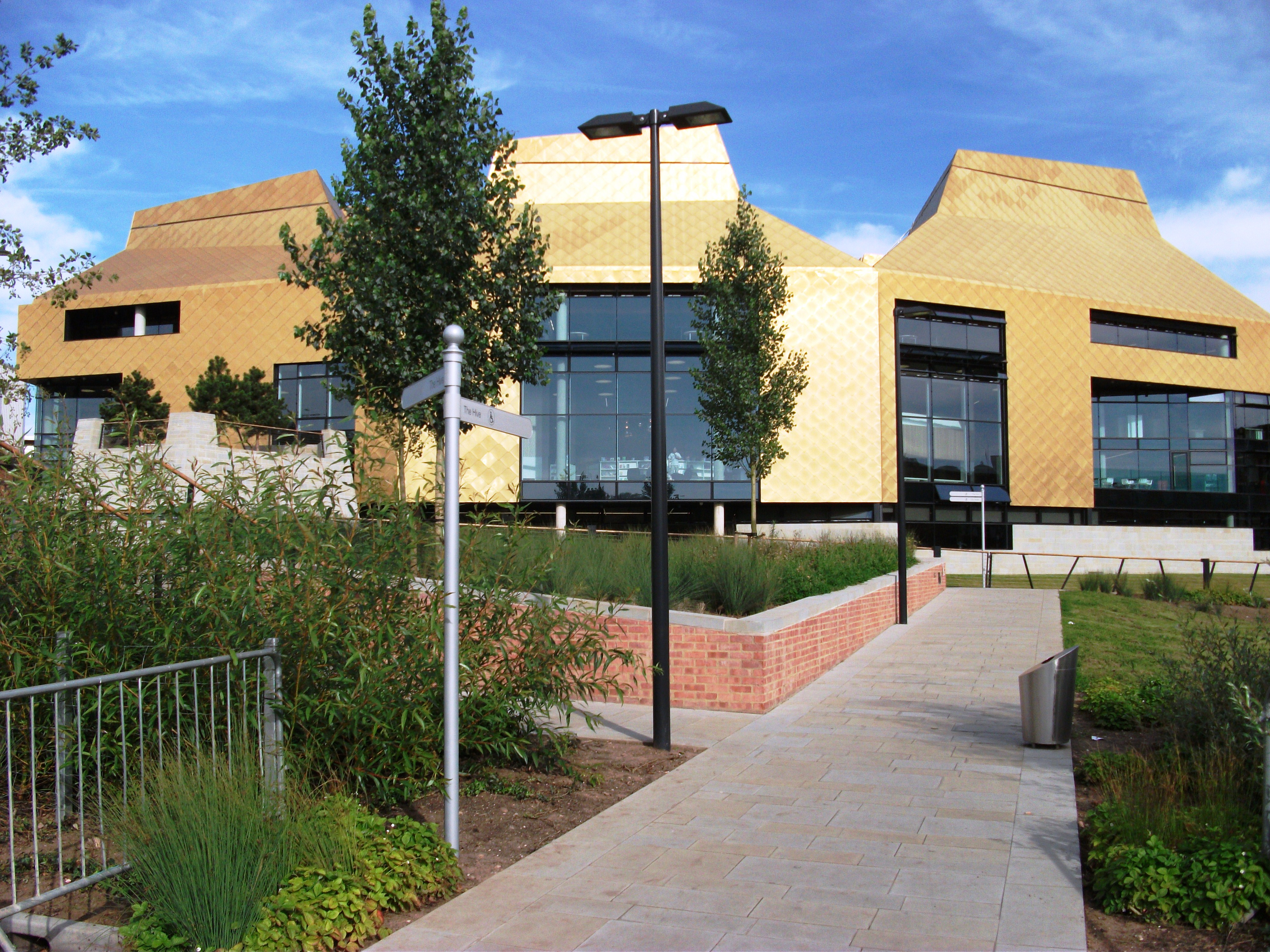
The Hive, Worcester

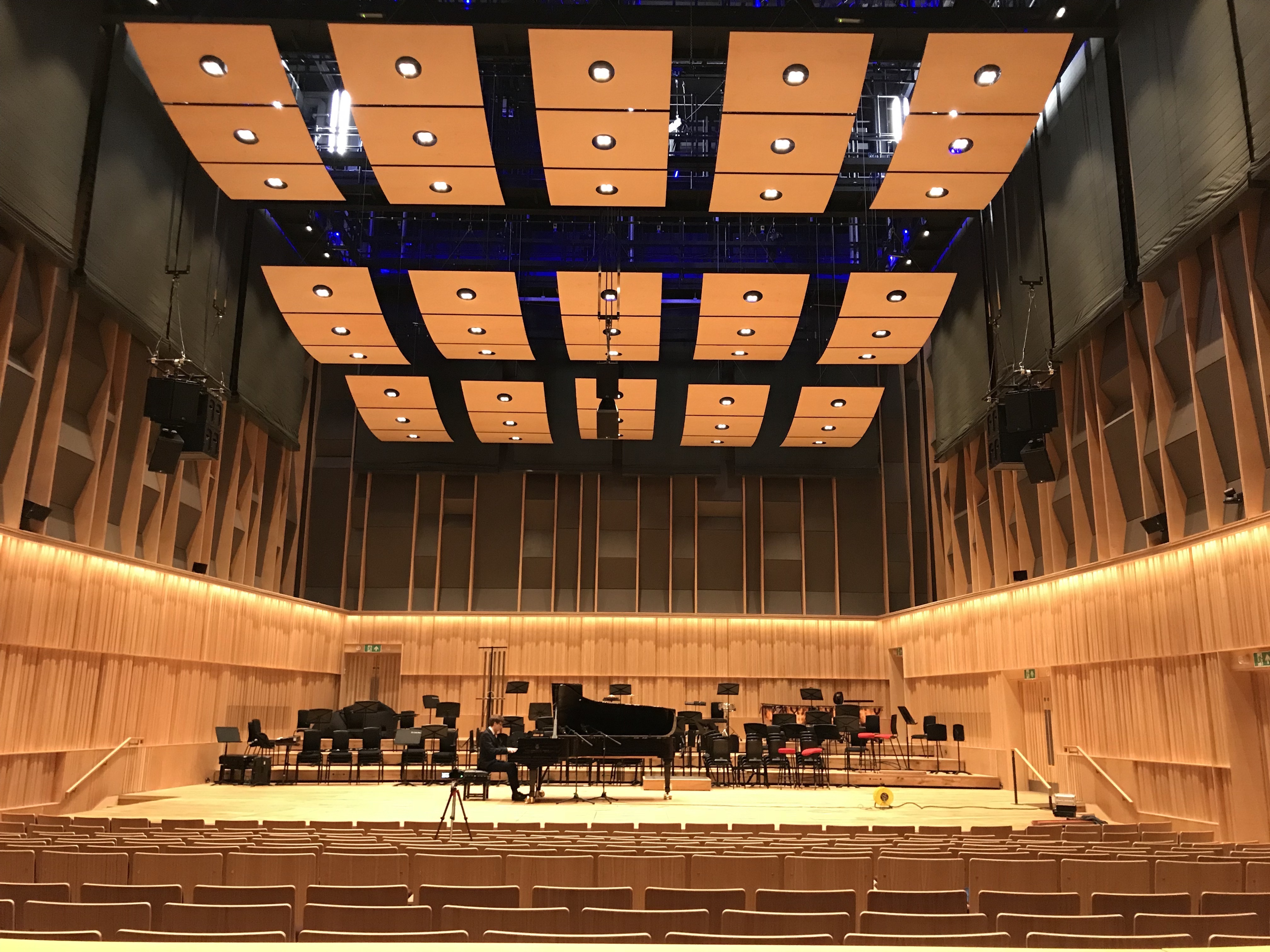
Royal Birmingham Conservatoire
Residential
- Accordia housing scheme, Cambridge
- Kirkstall Forge Housing
- New Mildmay, hospital, housing and church, Hackney
- Broadcasting Tower, Leeds, a student housing complex at Leeds Metropolitan University.
- Aston University Lakeside complex.
- 123 Cheyne Walk, London

Higher Education

- Manchester School of Art
- University of Roehampton Library
- Royal Birmingham Conservatoire, Birmingham
- Manchester Metropolitan University Business School
- University of Warwick Faculty of Arts
- University of Toronto Myhal Centre for Engineering Innovation and Entrepreneurship (MCEIE)
- Ulster University, Belfast City Campus

Schools

- The Charter School East Dulwich, London
- Art and Design Building, Bedales School, Steep, Hampshire.
- Plymouth School of Creative Arts
- Aga Khan Academy, Dhaka
- Tudor Grange Academy, Worcester
- Highfield Humanities College
- St Peter's Catholic Primary School, Gloucestershire
- Drapers' Academy, Harold Wood, Havering
- St Mary Magdalene Academy, Islington, London

Arts and Culture

- Alexandra Palace East Court and Theatre
- Southbank Centre: Refurbishment and Renewal of Hayward Gallery, Queen Elizabeth Hall and Purcell Room
- Yorkshire Sculpture Park
- Leventis Art Gallery
- Chedworth Roman Villa
- Jodrell Bank Discovery Centre, Jodrell Bank Observatory, Cheshire
- Derby QUAD.
- Persistence Works, Yorkshire ArtSpace.

Healthcare

- St Mary's Hospital Outpatients Building
- Dyson Centre for NeoNatal Care (NICU), Royal United Hospital Bath

Public and Community

- Stanbrook Abbey, new abbey buildings in North Yorkshire, given a RIBA National Award in 2016
- The Hive, Worcester, housing the Worcestershire County Council public library and the University of Worcester's academic library

Workplace

- Heelis, National Trust Headquarters
- Spreehalle, Berlin
- Woodland Trust Headquarters
- Neal's Yard Headquarters
- Runnymede Civic Centre
- Greenpeace Headquarters
- Middleport Pottery

Urban Design and Masterplanning

- Circle Square Manchester
- Southbank Leeds
- University of Sheffield Masterplan
- South Kilburn Estate Regeneration

== Awards ==
Feilden Clegg Bradley Studios was awarded the 2008 RIBA Stirling Prize for Accordia in Cambridge, designed in collaboration with Alison Brooks Architects and Maccreanor Lavington. The practice was shortlisted for the prize in 2014 for Manchester School of Art, and again in 2023 for the Faculty of Arts at the University of Warwick in Coventry.

In 2015 the practice was identified as the top RIBA Award-winning practice of the preceding decade, and has received 37 RIBA Awards, four RIBA Sustainability Awards and 22 Civic Trust Awards. It has also been recognised with the International Council on Tall Buildings and Urban Habitat (CTBUH) Award for Broadcasting Tower in Leeds, and by organisations including the World Architecture Festival, Building Design's Architect of the Year Awards, the Wood Awards, SCONUL Library Design Awards, the AJ100 Awards and the Building/UK Green Building Council Sustainability Awards.

== Richard Feilden Foundation ==
The Richard Feilden Foundation was established in 2005 in memory of Richard Feilden. Its mission is to support sustainable architecture and education projects in Africa, with an emphasis on community involvement and the use of local expertise and technologies. The foundation draws on the skills and knowledge of Feilden Clegg Bradley Studios in collaboration with partner organisations. Its projects include an HIV training clinic in Mzuzu, Malawi, the Rubengera Technical Secondary School in Rwanda, and several school developments in Uganda.
