= Accordia =

Housing development in Cambridge, England

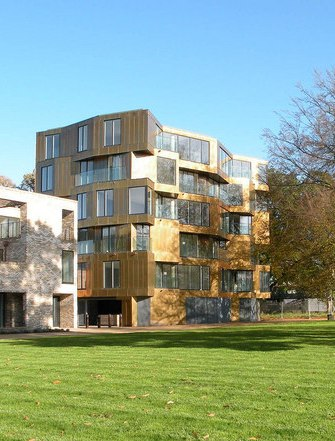
- Accordia ABA02 – The Alison Brooks Architects designed Brass Building on Kingfisher Way, Cambridge, CB2 8DL
- Interactive map of Accordia

General information
- Location: Cambridge, England
- Coordinates: 52.1905°N 0.128°E
- Status: Completed

Construction
- Constructed: 2003–2006 (phase 1); 2003-2011 (phases 2 and 3)

Accordia is a housing development in Cambridge, England. The 9.5-hectare (23.5-acre) site includes 378 dwellings by Feilden Clegg Bradley Architects, Maccreanor Lavington and Alison Brooks Architects and has been constructed in three phases. The first phase of the development became the first housing development to win the Royal Institute of British Architects (RIBA) Stirling Prize in 2008.

== History of the site ==
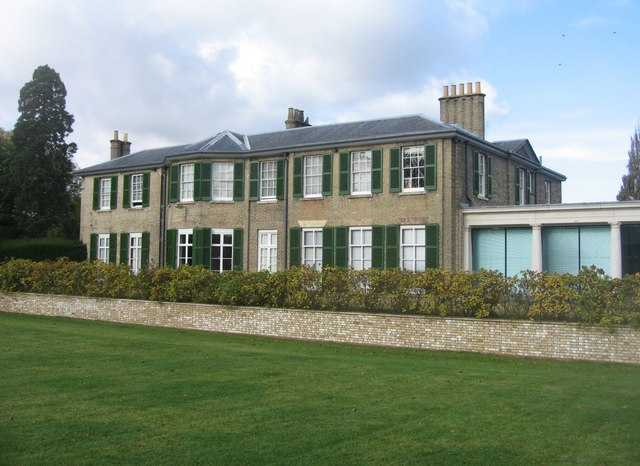
Grade II listed Brooklands House, home of English Heritage

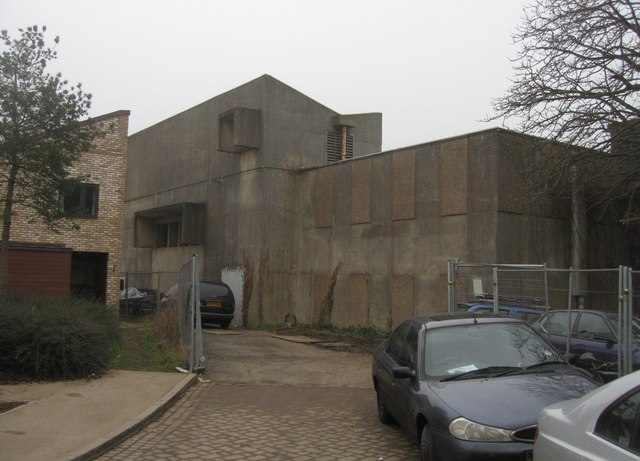
Grade II listed regional seat of government (nuclear bunker)

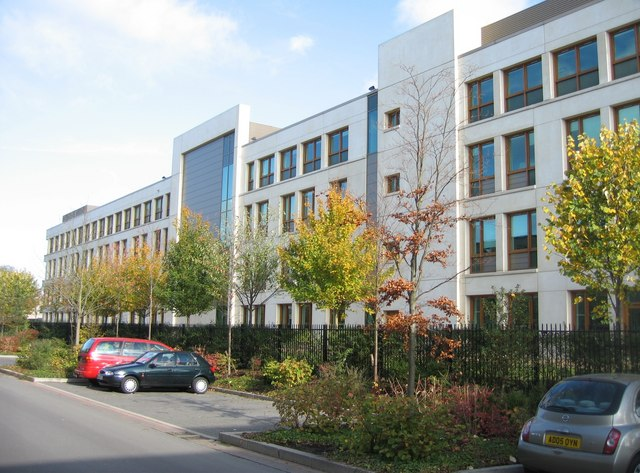
Eastbrook, home of HM Government offices

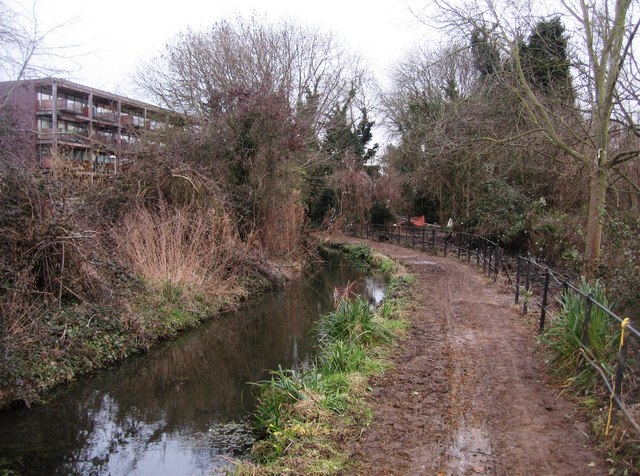
Hobson's Brook

Originally the site was part of a large garden to a country house. The country house called Brooklands House, at 24 Brooklands Avenue, is now the east of England regional office of English Heritage. The site was owned by the Ministry of Defence, and included post-World War II yellow prefab offices for the Inland Revenue (HMRC), the Department for Environment, Food and Rural Affairs (DEFRA) and the Driving Standards Agency. These building were later demolished after Kajima Cambridge, a subsidiary of Kajima Corporation, won the private finance initiative (PFI) contract in 1998 to build the 12,500-square-metre (135,000 sq ft) Eastbrook building next to the site in Shaftesbury Road for DEFRA and other government departments. The building was opened in 2003 and the building architects were Carey Jones Architects. The site also contained a Cold War underground nuclear bunker, and would have acted as a regional seat of government, in the event of a nuclear attack. The bunker was built in the early 1950s and expanded in the early 1960s. By July 2003 it was a Grade II listed building.

The site is bordered by Brooklands Avenue, including Brooklands House, to the north, Shaftesbury Road, including Eastbrook, to the east, the Cold War nuclear bunker to the south and Hobson's Brook to the west.

== Planning and construction ==
In 1996 Cambridge City Council published the 1996 Cambridge Local Plan, which identified the site off Brooklands Avenue for housing development. In that same year the City Council approved a development brief for proposals for the site.

By 2001, the joint venture between Countryside Properties and a US pension fund had submitted the first planning application to Cambridge City Council and by 2003 Countryside Properties had purchased the site from HM Government (UK) and had appointed Feilden Clegg Bradley Architects as the main architect for the site. By May 2003 Countryside Properties had submitted a revised planning application, which was also approved by Cambridge City Council, under Section 106 of the Town and Country Planning Act 1990 arrangement through which 30% of the homes would be for affordable housing. 113 affordable houses were for rent, for shared ownership and for key workers. The affordable houses were grant-funded from the Housing Corporation in 2004 and 2005.

The Architects Who Helped Design the Accordia Development and Their Houses

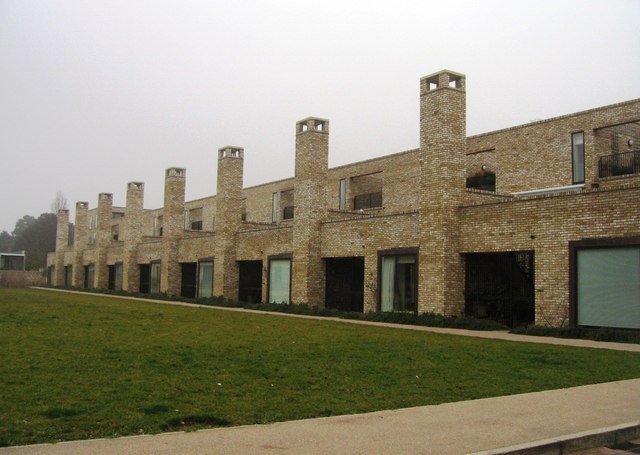
The main architects Feilden Clegg Bradley, who designed houses in Richard Foster Road

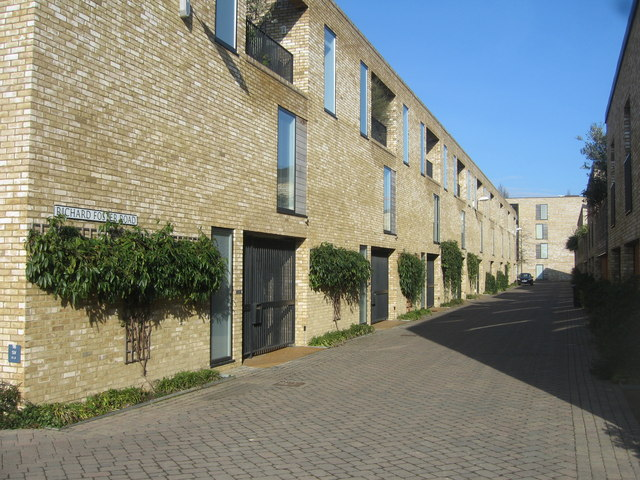
Maccreanor Lavington designed houses in Richard Foster Road

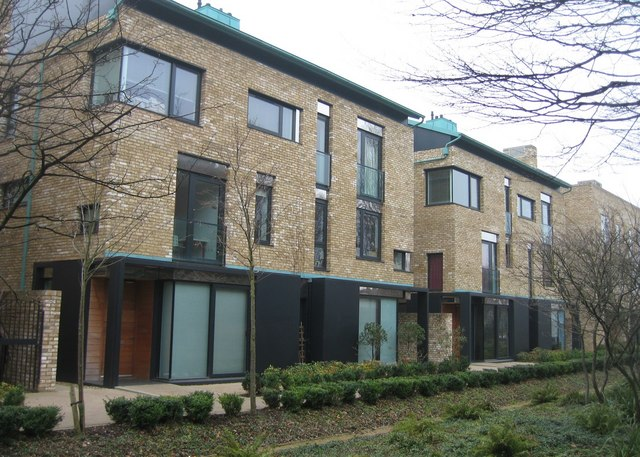
Alison Brooks-designed houses in Brooklands Avenue

In September 2003 Kajima, the contractors, began work on phase I of the brownfield site development. Countryside Properties later sold the site to Redeham Homes, who continued the development in phase II and III. Kajima also left the development after the first phase of the development. Redeham Homes took over the construction of the scheme in phase I and II.

The developers appointed Feilden Clegg Bradley as main architects. They also appointed Alison Brooks Architects to design four semi-detached villas on Brooklands Avenue and Maccreanor Lavington to design a long row of four-storey terraces. In total Feilden Clegg Bradley Architects designed 65% of the development, with Maccreanor Lavington 25% and Alison Brooks Architects designing 10%.

The development includes 378 dwellings, of which 166 are flats and 212 are houses); of these 30% are "affordable housing". Out of the 378 dwellings, there are 70 1-bed properties, 121 2-bed properties, 92 3-bed properties, 77 4-bed properties and 26 5-bed properties.

== Awards and nominations ==
Accordia has been nominated and won many awards. In 2008 it became the first housing development to win the Royal Institute of British Architects (RIBA) Stirling Prize. The judges for the competition only considered phase 1 of the scheme, to the north and west of the scheme.

2003
RIBA Housing Design Awards
- Accordia, in recognition of its overall design excellence
2004
Mail On Sunday National Homebuilder Design Awards
- Accordia, ‘Best Housing Project’ of the year
2006
Building for Life
- Building for Life Gold Standard for Accordia, Cambridge
Evening Standard New Homes Awards
- Best New Family Home for Accordia 'Air', Cambridge
Housing Design Awards
- “Overall Winner” and “Medium Housebuilder” category for Accordia, Cambridge
Mail on Sunday National HomeBuilder Design Awards
- Accordia, Cambridge was voted ‘best of the best’ winning ‘Best Housing Project of the Year’.
- Accordia ‘Air’ won ‘Best House (three storeys or more)’.
What House? Awards
- Best Development – Accordia, Cambridge – Gold
2007
British Homes Awards
- Development of the Year, Accordia, Cambridge (finalist)
The Wood Awards
- Highly commended in the private category
Civic Trust Awards
- Exemplary new residential scheme
Daily Telegraph (Your New Home Awards)
- Highly Commended for Best Architectural Innovation
2008
Daily Mail UK Property Awards
- 4 Star Award for Best Development
Hot Property Awards
- Gold Award for Design and Innovation
Whathouse Awards
- Gold for Best House
- Silver for Best Development
- Silver for Best Apartment
RIBA National Award
RIBA Stirling Prize
2009
- Nominated in the Brit Insurance Design Awards 2009 for architecture
