= Flint House, Buckinghamshire =

House in Waddesdon, Buckinghamshire, England

Coordinates: 51.8296°N 0.9433°W

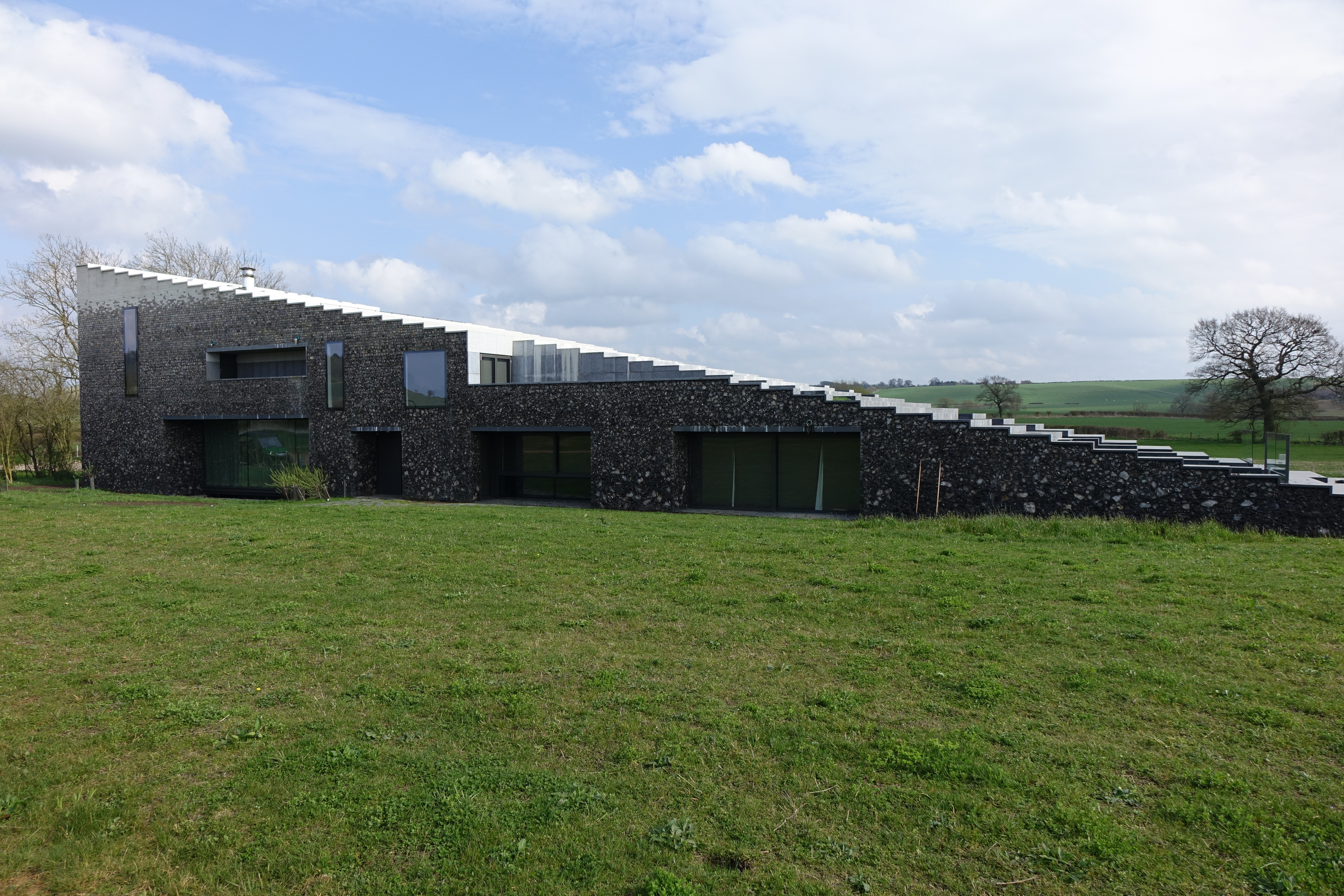
Intended to blend into the landscape, the rectangular structure of the Flint House is designed with a stepped roof, which rises from the ground to the full height of the building, creating wedge-shaped side elevations.

Flint House is a domestic dwelling located on the Waddesdon Estate, Buckinghamshire, England.

Designed by architect Charlotte Skene-Catling, of Skene Catling de la Peña and commissioned by Jacob Rothschild, 4th Baron Rothschild, the house was completed in 2015. That year, the building was awarded the RIBA House of the Year.

Built primarily from flint and limestone, the house reflects its position above a major chalk seam. The exterior is formed from hand-knapped flint graded in tonal bands, while the long, narrow plan, stepped roof, and integration of water, light, and landscape shape both the architecture and its setting.

The interiors were designed by David Mlinaric and furnished with a mix of contemporary works and pieces from the Rothschild collection. Flint House is owned by the Rothschild Foundation and is used to accommodate visiting scholars and artists, with public access available by arrangement.

== Architecture ==
The internal layout utilizes varying ceiling heights and sightlines.

During initial surveys of the site, it was discovered that the Flint House sits directly above the seam of chalk that runs from Kent to Norfolk. This informed the architect's decision to use flint (a sediment of chalk) and limestone as the principal building materials.

Despite the abundance of naturally-occurring stone on the Waddesdon estate, the stone used to construct the house was sourced from quarries in Norfolk.

The stones for the exterior were hand-knapped by flint knappers John Lord and Simon Williams in Norfolk. The technique was the same as that used to craft squar- section hand axes, originating in prehistoric Denmark.

The knapped flints were graded into six finely graduated shades to create bands of colour in the walls, changing from the darkest flint at ground level to the lightest chalk at roof level. The gradation of the flint is intended to match the typical color of the local skyline.

The long, rectangular structure is designed with an unusual stepped roof which rises from the ground to the building's full height, creating wedge-shaped side elevations. The plan is long and thin, in places only one room wide. The building's triangular shape also resembles a flint.

The house's interior features an open-plan ground floor, with the kitchen at the center of an almost enfilade arrangement comprising a dining room, a small sitting room, and a drawing room, beyond which lies a study.

The study was inspired by the Baron's room at nearby Waddesdon Manor, where the private study of Baron Ferdinand de Rothschild contains a small spiral staircase leading to his bedroom directly above. Within the Flint House, the study too contains a steep spiral staircase leading directly to the principal bedroom. The upper floor also contains two additional bedrooms. Each of the three bedrooms has a small adjoining bathroom with a sunken bath, and its own private roof terrace in the stepped roof.

Throughout the design, the natural elements of water, air, and fire have been used. Air is created by the use of double height spaces and abundance of large windows which not only light the house, but bring the landscape within. Water is used to create a sense of fluidity and reflection: a small stream running near the house has been diverted to run through and around the building before flowing to a nearby pool. The stream has been further enhanced by small dams, which limit and adjust the flow of water, from a slow, subtly flowing rill to a more agitated, fast flowing stream. In one recessed corner of the house, the stream forms a pool around, which a glazed flint grotto, illuminated by small led lights, has been designed. While inside the house, the water is visible through a glass floor, which seems to create a bridge from the drawing room. Fire is reflected through a glass panel at the rear of the drawing room fireplace into the pool of the grotto at its rear.

The house has a small annex designed in the same style, detached from the main house, but linked to it through an architectural scheme that presents a visual avenue flowing from the top of the stepped roof down the ground. Then transforming into a rising stepped grass path leading to the annex. The annex itself is a smaller version of the main house intended for staff or guests.

The interiors were decorated and furnished by David Mlinaric, using a mix of modern contemporary pieces and older items from the Rothschild collection.

== Grounds ==
The grounds and distant annex, viewed from the highest point of the stepped roof

The house sits at the heart of the Waddesdon estate, set within the open countryside and surrounded by grass pastures and fields.

It can be accessed exclusively by a narrow track. While it is only a few hundred meters from its nearest neighbours, the Rothschild Archive building and a farm cottage cannot be seen from the Flint house due to a fold in the landscape. The architect, Charlotte Skene Catling, has described the house as "jutting from the ground like a collision of tectonic plates."

The house rises directly from indigenous grasses and wildflowers.

The roof's stepped design incorporates small rectangular pockets designed to be easily colonized by indigenous plants. This, in time, combined with the naturally occurring mosses and, in time, weather-worn stone steps of the roof, is intended to permit the building to blend into and be absorbed by the landscape.

== Awards ==
In 2015, Flint House won the RIBA House of the Year Award. Channel 4 featured the house as part of Grand Designs: House of the Year in November 2015.

== Public access ==
The house was given to the Rothschild Foundation and accommodates visitors, including academics and artists working on projects at Waddesdon Manor, and the Rothschild Getty Fellow.

Flint House is open to visitors at certain times for group visits.
