= Alison Brooks =

Canadian architect (born 1962)

Alison Brooks OBE FRSA RIBA RDI
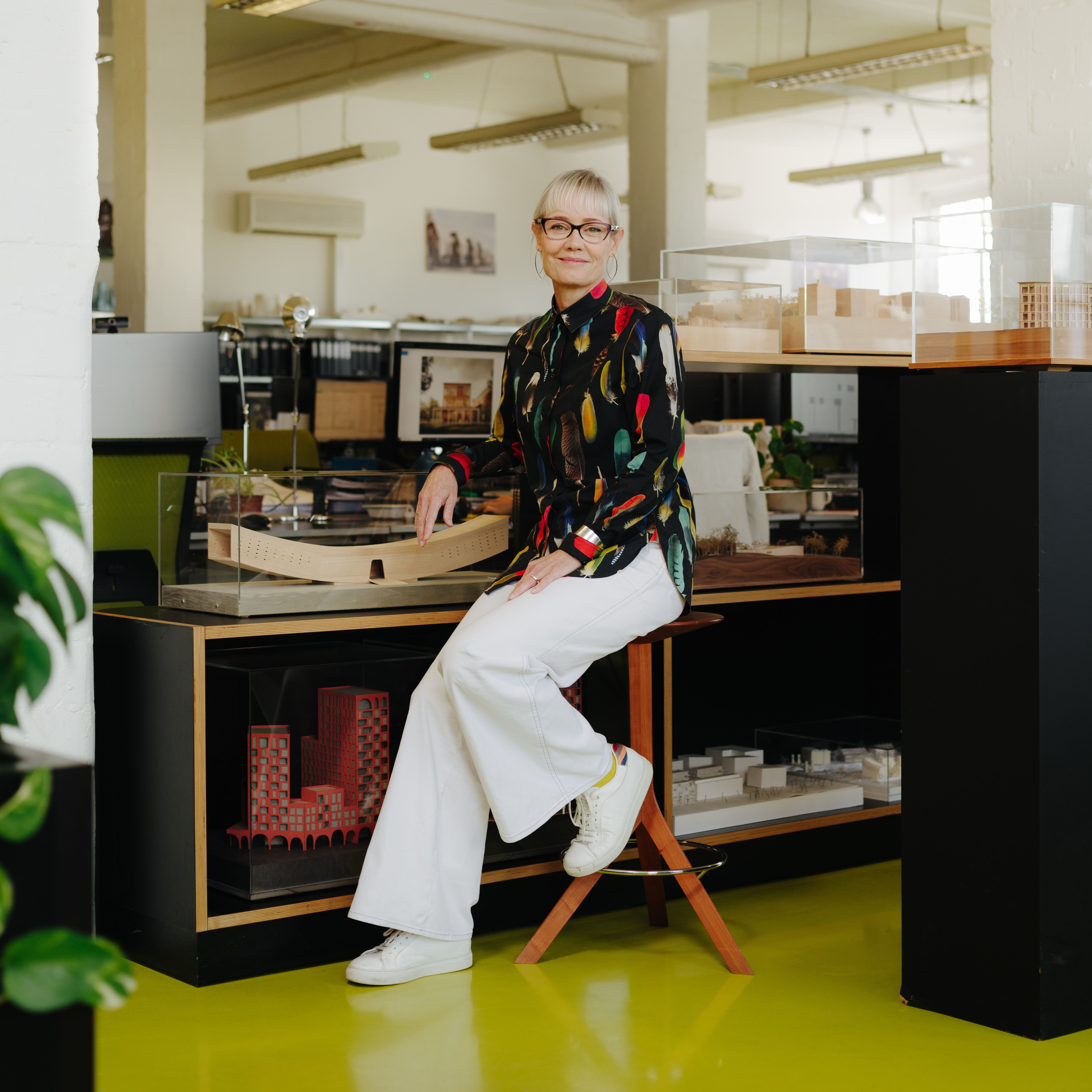
- Brooks at Highgate Studios, London
- Born: 1962 (age 63–64); Welland, Ontario, Canada
- Education: University of Waterloo
- Occupation: Architect
- Practice: Alison Brooks Architects
- Buildings: Exeter College Cohen Quadrangle (Oxford), Newhall Be (Harlow), Quarterhouse Performing Arts Centre (Folkestone), Accordia Brass Building and Sky Villas (Cambridge), Ely Court (London), Windward House (Gloucestershire), Salt House (Essex)
- Projects: The Smile (Chelsea School of Art) and her two installations at the Venice Architecture Biennale
- Website: www.alisonbrooksarchitects.com

Alison Barbara Brooks (born 1962) is a Canadian-British architect. She is the founder and creative director of Alison Brooks Architects, based in London. Her awards include the RIBA Stirling Prize, Manser Medal, Stephen Lawrence Prize, and RIBA House of the Year.

Her designs include the Exeter College Cohen Quad at Oxford University, Smile at the Chelsea College of Arts, Accordia Brass Building and Sky Villas, and Windward House. In 2018 Brooks was invited to contribute to the Venice Architecture Biennale. Alison Brooks Architects won Dezeen Architect of the Year 2020.

== Biography and early career ==
Brooks was born and lived her early years in Welland, Canada, but moved to Guelph where she attended John F. Ross Collegiate Vocational Institute. She finished her studies in architecture with a BES and BArch at the University of Waterloo in 1988.

Brooks moved to the UK and worked with designer Ron Arad, becoming a partner at Ron Arad Associates in 1991. With Arad, she co-designed the Foyer of the Tel Aviv Opera. Other projects included the restaurants Belgo Noord and Belgo Centraal.

She founded her practice Alison Brooks Architects in 1996, receiving a breakout commission a year later to design a hotel interior on the German island of Helgoland.

=== Private residences and housing ===
Notable private residences completed in the 2000s include VXO House, Wrap House and Salt House. Brooks' architecture of this period was described by Jonathan Glancey as "a late flowering of the most elegant and sensuous modernism".

Alison Brooks Architects' Sky Villas and Brass Building in the 2008 Stirling Prize-winning Accordia, Cambridge masterplan paved the way for work in housing. Notable projects include the Stirling Prize-shortlisted Newhall Be, and the 2018 Mies Van Der Rohe Award finalist Ely Court in London.

Windward House in Gloucester, also called House on the Hill, won both the RIBA House of the year and the Architects' Journal Manser Medal in 2021. Simon Allford, president of the Royal Institute of British Architects, said it was "an extraordinary labour of love in architectural form... resulting in a truly remarkable home."

=== Cultural and higher education buildings ===
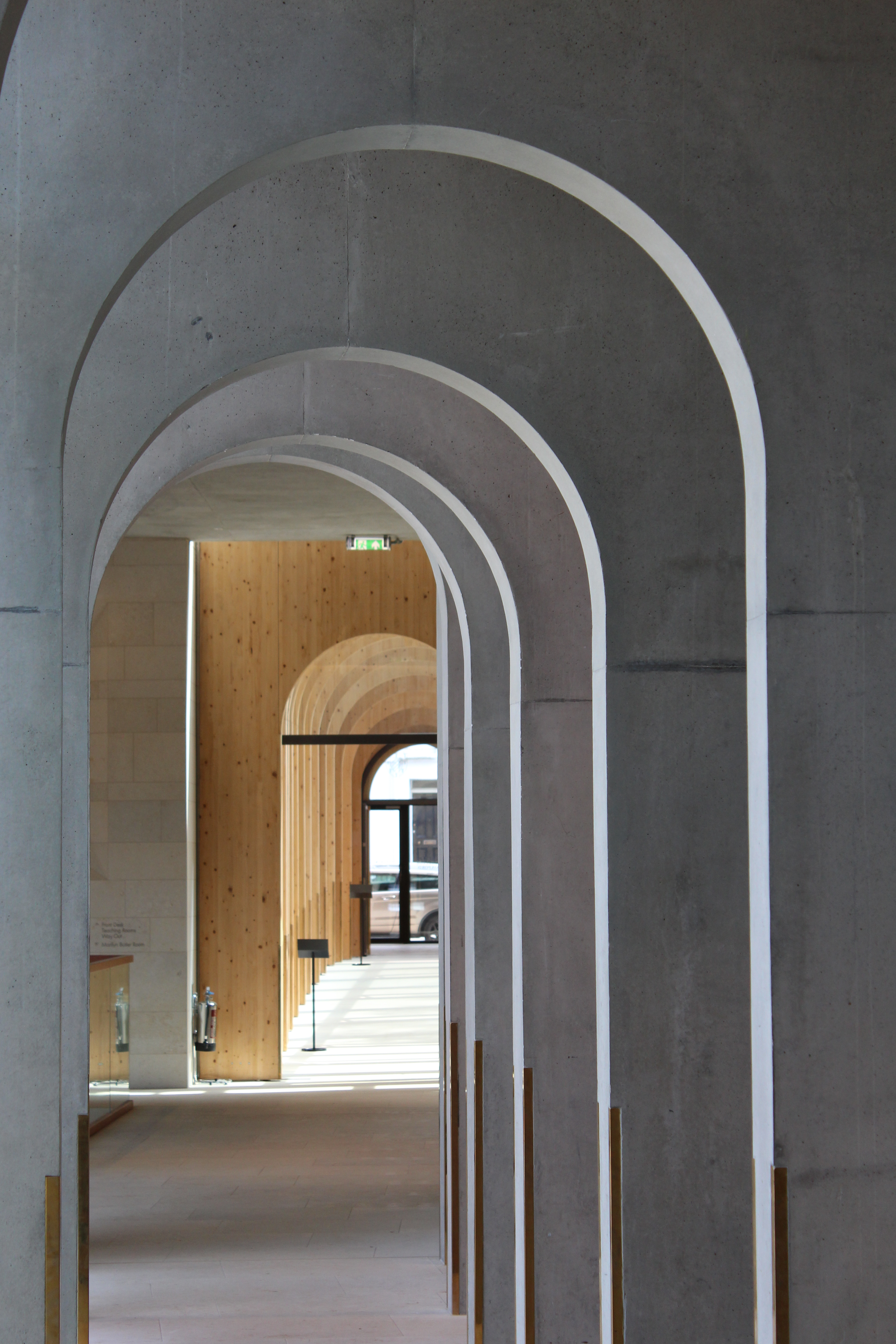
The Elliptical Cloisters of Exeter College, Oxford Cohen Quadrangle (2017)

Quarterhouse in Folkestone, Brooks' first building for the performing arts, was completed in 2009. The building's notable fluted mesh cladding was inspired by the maritime iconography of Fokestone, the translucency of local scallop shells, and the stage curtains that the building would house. Exeter College, Oxford's 6000 square metre Cohen Quadrangle also featured an innovative cladding and opened its doors to students in 2017, winning multiple awards for education building design. Rowan Moore, The Guardian's architecture critic, described the new Quad as "A tour de force that puts people first."

Design for the new entrance building and porters lodge of Homerton College, Cambridge is in its final stages. Alison Brooks Architects was shortlisted, from close to 200 international expressions of interest, to redevelop the London School of Economics' 43 Lincolns Inn Fields into the new Firoz Lalji Global Hub.

=== Exhibitions, installations and furniture ===
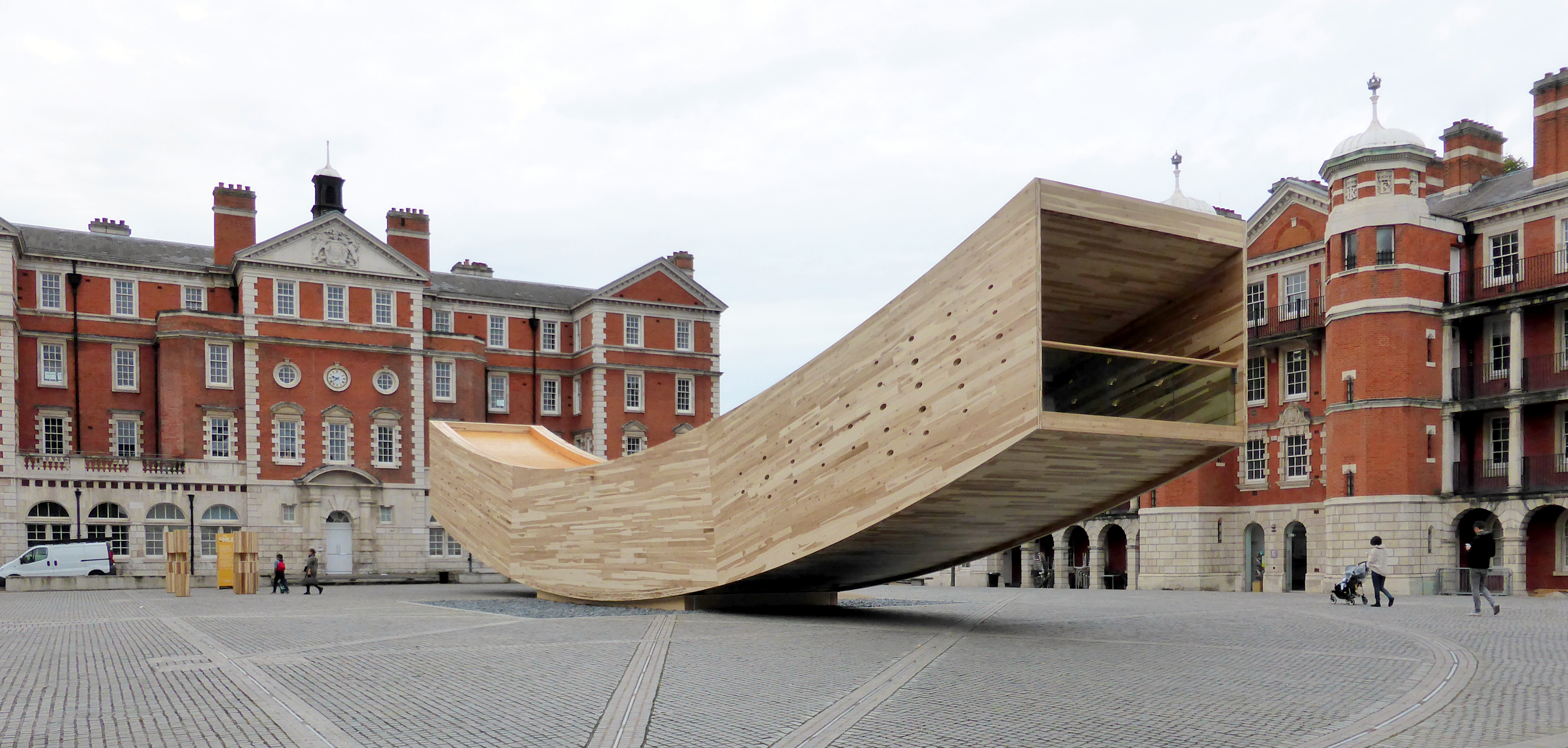
The Smile at the Chelsea College of Arts, London Design Festival (2016)

The Smile was a project for the 2016 London Design Festival; a public pavilion in the Chelsea College of Art (UAL) parade ground that showcased the structural and spatial potential of cross–laminated hardwood using American tulipwood. ARUP engineer Andrew Lawrence described The Smile as "the most complex CLT structure that has ever been built."

Alison Brooks Architects has contributed to the International Architecture Exhibition of La Biennale di Venezia four times. ReCasting, the practice's notable installation at the 2018 Biennale simulated the critical freespaces of work in housing as four inhabitable "totems": Threshold, Inhabited Edge, Passage and Roofspace. Home Ground was Alison Brooks Architects' contribution to the Biennale Architettura 2021 in Venice.

== Awards and recognition ==
Brooks is the only architect of the UK to have won all three of the RIBA awards: the RIBA Stephen Lawrence Prize (for The Wrap House, in 2006), the RIBA Manser Medal (in 2014 for the Lens House), and the RIBA Stirling Prize for their part in the design of Accordia, a high-density development of 378 residential rooms.

In 2012, Brooks was named Architect of the Year by Building Design Magazine. In March 2013, she received the Architects' Journal's Woman Architect of the Year Award. One of the judges, Paul Monaghan, said: "Her mixture of sculpture, architecture and detail is what has made her such a powerful force in British architecture." In 2020, Alison Brooks Architects was named Dezeen Architect of the Year, with the judges commenting, "A groundbreaking practice with great ethos – particularly the way that they question both norms and the profession itself."

She was appointed Officer of the Order of the British Empire (OBE) in the 2026 Birthday Honours for services to architecture.

Notable awards
Year	Award	2021	RIBA House of the Year – Windward House, Gloucestershire RIBA National Award – Windward House, Gloucestershire Manser Medal – AJ House of the Year – Windward House, Gloucestershire	2020	Dezeen Awards — Architect of the Year 2020 Civic Trust Awards Winner Building Design Architect of the Year Awards — Housing Architect of the Year Building Design Architect of the Year Awards — Individual House Architect of the Year, Highly Commended

== See also ==
- List of University of Waterloo people
