= Broadcasting Tower, Leeds =

Broadcasting Tower
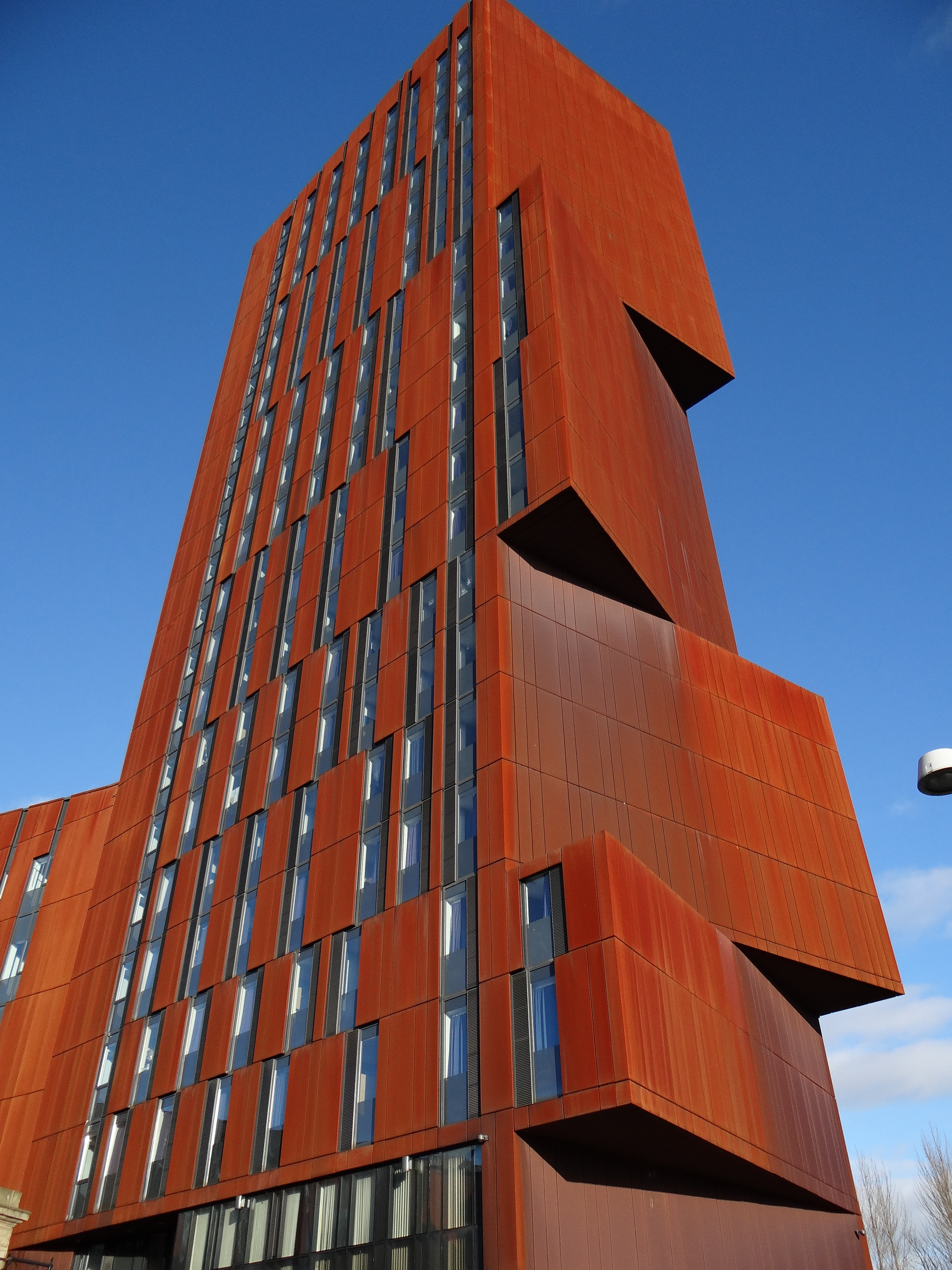
- Interactive map of the Broadcasting Tower area

General information
- Status: Completed
- Type: Student accommodation in Leeds
- Location: Woodhouse Lane, Leeds
- Coordinates: 53.8058°N 1.5479°W
- Construction started: 2008
- Completed: 2009
- Owner: Downing

Height
- Roof: 70 metres (230 ft)

Design and construction
- Architect: Feilden Clegg Bradley
- Structural engineer: Halcrow Group

Website
- broadcastingtower.com

Broadcasting Tower is a university building in Broadcasting Place in Woodhouse Lane, Leeds, England. Adjacent to other university buildings, it forms part of Leeds Beckett University; it houses the Faculty of Arts, Environment and Technology, while the main tower section consists of student flats. It was designed by Stirling Prize-winning architects Feilden Clegg Bradley. It is clad in COR-TEN weathering steel, which has given it the rust-like appearance it is known for.

The owners, Unite, are one of the UK's largest operators of purpose-built student accommodation. They provide accommodation for over 46,000 students in 133 properties across 28 of the UK's university cities. From September 2016 the accommodation space within Broadcasting Tower will be solely for Leeds Beckett University students.

In June 2010, Broadcasting Place was the recipient of the 2010 Best Tall Building in the World award by the Council on Tall Buildings and Urban Habitat.

In 2024 the cladding was temporarily removed as part of an extensive refurbishment.
