= David Mlinaric =

British interior decorator (born 1939)

David Mlinaric CBE (born 12 March 1939) is a British interior decorator.

== Early life ==
Mlinaric is the son of an English mother and an Austro-Hungarian father, a furrier who had emigrated to England in 1912 from modern-day Slovenia.

He was educated at Downside School and the Bartlett School of Architecture at University College, London.

== Career ==
His work ranges from commissions for private clients including Lord Rothschild and Mick Jagger to public galleries and museums – the National Gallery, London, the National Portrait Gallery, London and Victoria and Albert museum among them – as well as many buildings belonging to the National Trust. He has designed or decorated interiors from all over the world, including the Royal Opera House, Covent Garden, houses and flats in England, Ireland and the United States, Italy, Corfu, and Mustique, and the British Embassies in Washington and Paris.

In 2009, he was appointed a CBE for services to Interior Design and Heritage. In 2022, David Mlinaric was presented with the House & Garden Top 100 Lifetime Achievement Award sponsored by Lapicida.

== Personal life ==
In 1969, Mlinaric married Martha Laycock, daughter of Major General Sir Robert Laycock. They have two daughters and one son:

- Jessica Rose Mlinaric (born 1970)
- Frances Josepha Octavia Mlinaric (born 1972), married Andrew Penn
- Nicholas Maximilian Mlinaric (born 1977), married Rewa O'Neill
