= Factum Arte =

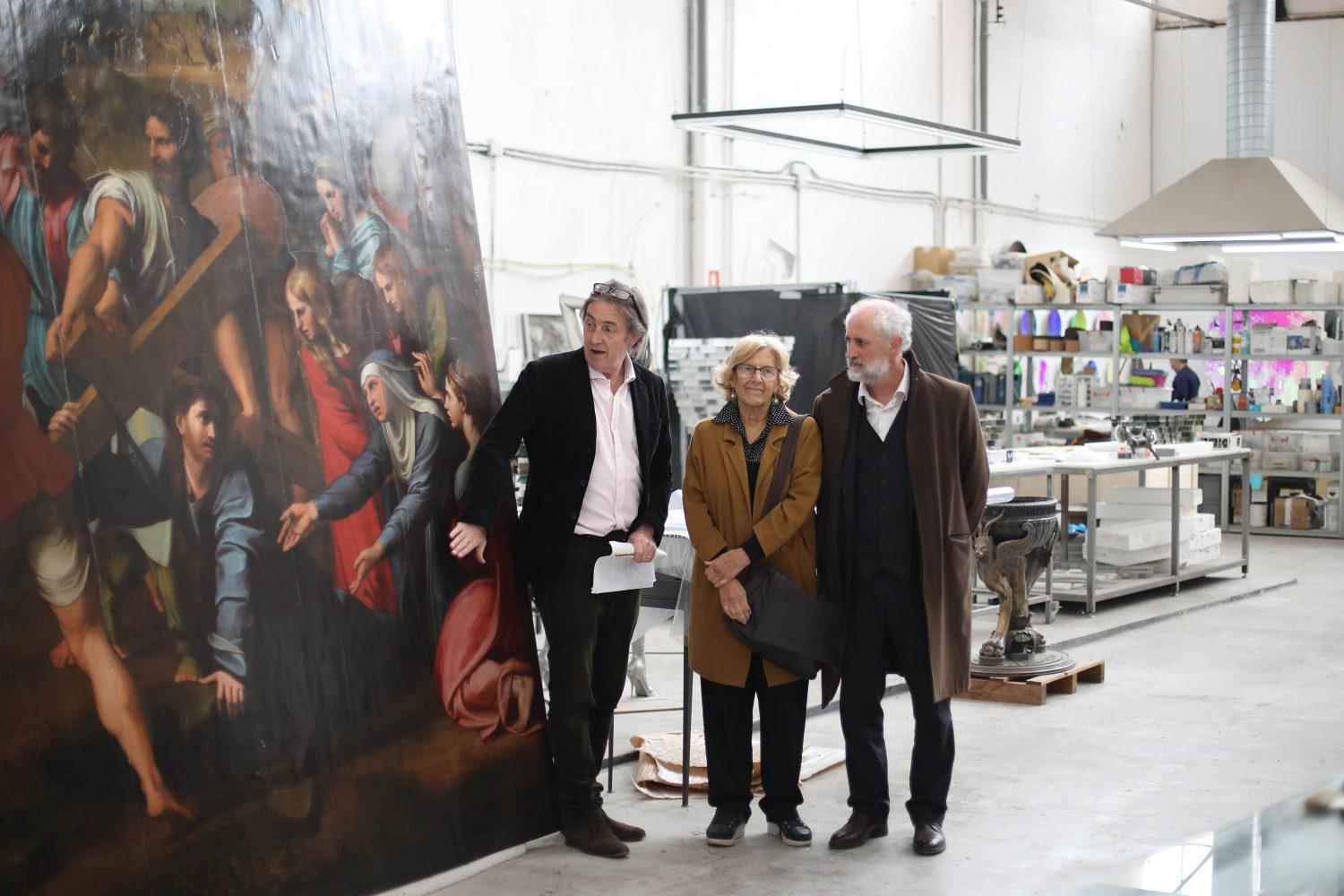
Adam Lowe, founder of Factum Arte, with Manuela Carmena, ex-mayor of Madrid (2015-2019), in the Factum Arte premises in Madrid.

Factum Arte is an art conservation company based in Madrid specialising in the making of facsimiles for preservation purposes. It was founded in 2001 by artist Adam Lowe, engineer and artist Manuel Franquelo, and technologist Fernando Garcia-Guereta, initially to facilitate the recording of the Tomb of Seti I.

The company's commercial activity involves assisting contemporary artists, including Marc Quinn and Anish Kapoor, to create technically difficult and innovative works of art.

Since 2009, Factum Arte's non-profit cultural heritage projects have been carried out through the Factum Foundation for Digital Technology in Preservation, through which the studio seeks to promote the use of non-contact 3D digitisation technologies to record museum collections and historic monuments, especially in areas where these are at risk.

Factum Arte has worked with institutions such as the British Museum in London, the Musée du Louvre in Paris, the Pergamon Museum in Berlin, the Museo del Prado in Madrid, and the Supreme Council of Antiquities in Egypt.

== Technology ==
Factum Arte has developed a number of technologies in order to better facilitate the recording and production of accurate facsimiles. These methods are used by Factum Foundation to record paintings, sculptures, sites and all types of objects and artefacts.

The Lucida 3D Laser Scanner is capable of scanning surface relief, without contact, and with a depth of field of 2.5 cm at resolution of 100 microns. The scanner is designed to be portable, and easy to set up and operate; with the aim to make the recording of objects and sites more feasible and accessible for both individuals and institutions.

More recently, Factum Arte developed the Selene Photometric Stereo System, a high-resolution, non-contact recording system designed to capture extremely fine surface texture and relief. Developed in collaboration with researchers at the University of Oxford, the Selene scanner uses photometric stereo techniques – combining multiple images of an object taken under varying lighting conditions – to calculate detailed surface normals and reconstruct the micro-topography of a work with very high precision. The system is capable of recording surface detail at a sub-millimetre level, revealing features that are often invisible to the naked eye or to conventional scanning methods. Selene has been used by institutions including the Bodleian Library at the University of Oxford, to record paintings, inscriptions and low-relief surfaces, providing data that can support both conservation analysis and the study of artists' techniques; its application has enabled new insights into the condition, making and material history of artworks, including the identification of tool marks, underdrawing, erasures and later interventions.

While the company's cement printer, designed by engineer Dwight Perry, aims to print a 3-dimensional concrete structure directly from CAD files. A prototype was displayed at the GENESIS exhibition, about genetics, at the Centraal Museum in Utrecht in 2007. In 2009 the artist Anish Kapoor utilised a second prototype of the printer as an investigation into new ways of developing form. Kapoor used the results of his experimentation as a piece, entitled 'Greyman Cries, Shaman Dies, Billowing Smoke, Beauty Evoked', in his solo exhibition at the Royal Academy in London. Kapoor's vision and process was detailed in a book Unconformity and Entropy, published by Turner Books in 2010 - ISBN 978-8475068916. The cement printer is currently undergoing development at Factum Arte's workshop in Madrid.

== Notable projects ==
=== Tomb of Seti I ===
Factum Arte was founded in 2001 in order to facilitate the development of technology needed specifically for the recording of the Tomb of Seti I.

=== Tomb of Thutmose III ===
Parts of one of the facsimiles of the Tomb of Thutmose III, in the Grand Egyptian Museum.

In 2002, Factum Arte was commissioned by United Exhibits Group to make a 1:1 facsimile of the Tomb of Thutmose III. The facsimile was toured at exhibitions in various museums in the United States between November 2002 and December 2007. In 2005, a second facsimile of the tomb was made and exhibited in Madrid, Edinburgh, and Basel titled Immortal Pharaoh: The Tomb of Thutmose III (Edinburgh) and The Tomb of Thutmose III: The Dark Hours of the Sun (Madrid and Basel). Today, sections of one of the facsimiles currently resides in the Grand Egyptian Museum.

=== Tomb of Tutankhamun ===
The facsimile of the Tomb of Tutankhamun, near Howard Carter’s house.

In 2012, the company presented its facsimile of the Tomb of Tutankhamun in Cairo on the 90th anniversary of the discovery of the original tomb.

In 2014, Factum Arte completed the installation of an exact facsimile of the tomb of Tutankhamun in the Valley of the Kings in Luxor, near Howard Carter’s house. The facsimile was made as part of a new approach to preservation and mass tourism; as Factum Arte's Director, Adam Lowe, has said: "The tomb of Tutankhamun was built to last for eternity, but it wasn't built to be visited".

=== The Wedding Feast at Cana ===
In November 2007, Factum Arte's facsimile of The Wedding Feast at Cana (1563), by Paolo Veronese, was presented by the Cini Foundation in the original location of the painting, the Andrea Palladio's refectory for the Monastery of San Giorgio Maggiore, Venice. The original painting, commissioned in 1562, was plundered by the French Revolutionary Army of Napoleon in 1797 and sent to the Louvre Museum, where it hangs opposite the Mona Lisa. The facsimile was commissioned in 2006 by the Fondazione Giorgio Cini and, following an agreement with the Louvre, Factum Arte's technicians were allowed to scan the painting at night. Corriere della Sera called the facsimile a "turning point in art".

=== Caravaggio ===
In 2015, Factum Arte recreated the Nativity with Saint Francis and Saint Lawrence (1609) by Caravaggio for the Oratory of San Lorenzo in Palermo, from which the original painting had been stolen in October 1969 and remains missing. The theft, widely considered one of the most significant art crimes of the 20th century, left the altar empty for decades with only a photographic reproduction in its place. Using historical photographs, slides and glass-plate negatives – together with comparative study of Caravaggio's technique – the Factum Arte team reconstructed the composition and surface appearance of the lost painting at full scale.

The facsimile was installed in December 2015, raising awareness of the altarpiece's disappearance and contributing to public discussion of the broader issues surrounding cultural loss and restitution. The project is cited as a significant example of the use of digital technologies for the rematerialisation of lost cultural heritage.

=== Piranesi ===
In 2010 the Cini Foundation commissioned the visualisation and manufacture of objects designed by the 18th century artist and antiquarian Giambattista Piranesi. The project was conceived by Adam Lowe, Michele De Lucchi, and John Wilton-Ely and was exhibited in the Cini Foundation on the island of San Giorgio Maggiore for the Venice Biennale. The objects were later toured for exhibitions in Madrid, Barcelona, and San Diego

In March–May 2014, Factum Arte exhibited the series at the Sir John Soane's Museum in London. Diverse Manieri: Piranesi, Fantasy and Excess aimed to explore the relationship between Sir John Soane and Piranesi. The objects were shown in the context of prints, drawings and books in Soane's library.

The manufacture of the objects involved a variety of methods including stereolithography, milling, fused deposition modelling, electro forming and electro plating, in addition to a host of moulding and casting technologies

=== Polittico Griffoni ===
The 16 panels of the Polittico Griffoni once formed the altarpiece of the Basilica of San Petronio in Bologna. It was considered one of the greatest altarpieces of the 15th Century Bolognese School. The panels were originally painted by Francesco del Cossa and Ercole De Roberti. The panels, removed in 1725, are now scattered in various museums in Italy, the United Kingdom, the United States, France, the Netherlands, and the Vatican City.

Using the Lucida 3D scanner, designed by Factum Arte founder Manuel Franquelo, the team from Factum Arte and the Factum Foundation for Digital Technology in Preservation collaborated with San Petronio Basilica to record, reproduce and reunite the panels as a facsimile in their original location. Factum Foundation organised an exhibition around the Polittico Griffoni and the role of new technologies in cultural preservation at Palazzo Fava in 2020.

=== Tabula Rogeriana ===
In 2017, a recreation of the lost silver map version of the Tabula Rogeriana was completed by Factum Arte. The original was commissioned by the King Roger II of Sicily in 1138 and completed by the Arab geographer Muhammad al-Idrisi in 1154. The original silver map was destroyed in a rebellion headed by Matthew Bonnellus in 1160, but the manuscripts prepared by Al-Idrisi survived and were used by Factum Arte as a reference for the recreation.

=== Colossus of Constantine ===
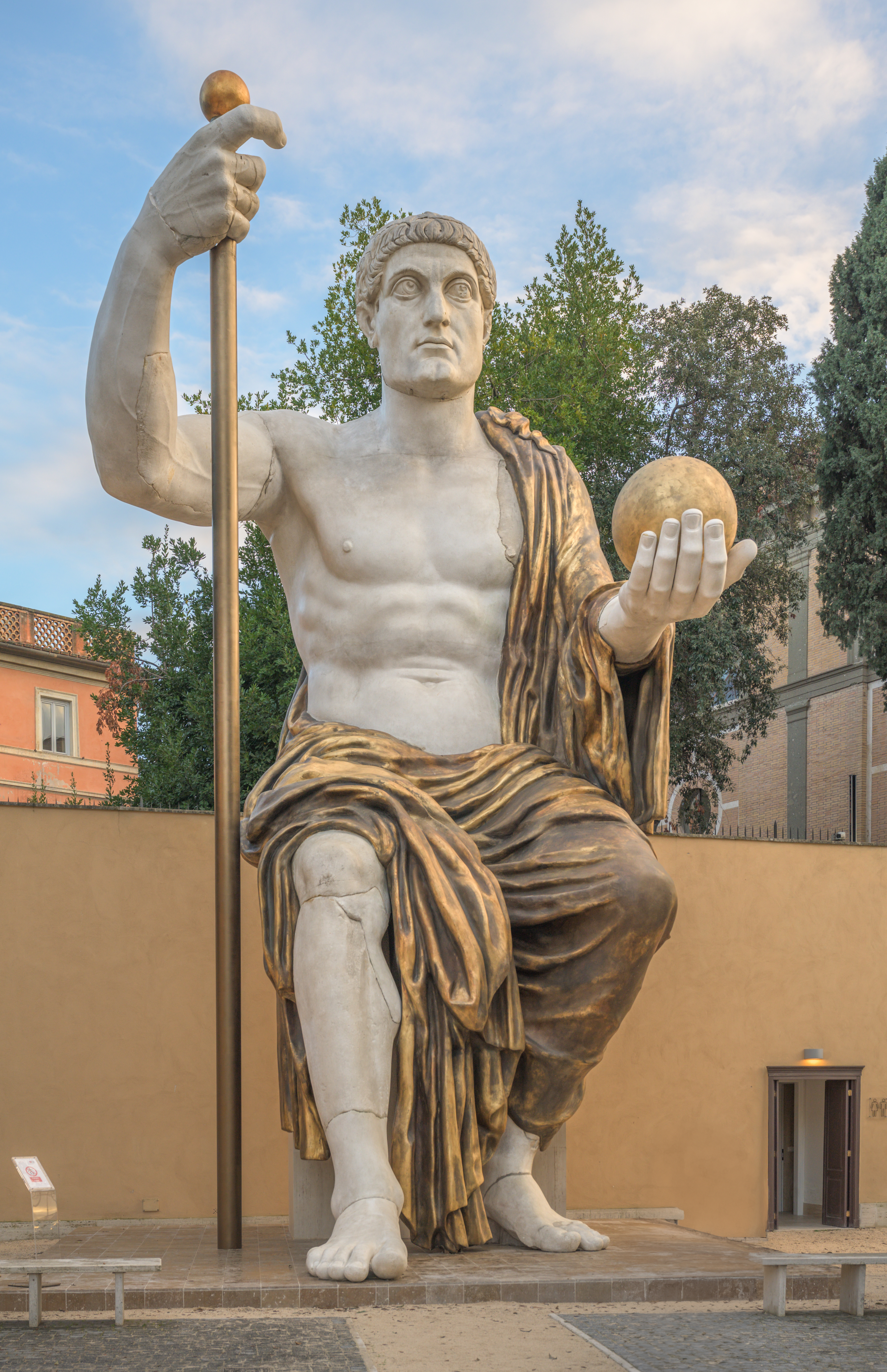
Reconstructed version at the Capitoline Museum in 2024

In March 2022, researchers at Factum Arte used photogrammetry and LiDAR technology to create three-dimensional models of the surviving fragments of the Colossus of Constantine. In collaboration with the Capitoline Museums, the team reconstructed the statue's original form, measuring approximately 13 m (42 ft 8 in) in height, based on technical analysis of the fragments, supported by historical and epigraphic sources. Elements derived from the surviving fragments were reproduced as facsimiles and visually distinguished from the reconstructed portions of the statue.

The completed reconstruction was first displayed at the exhibition Recycling Beauty at the Fondazione Prada from 17 November 2022 – 27 February 2023, curated by Salvatore Settis. On 6 February 2024, it was installed in the gardens of the Villa Caffarelli as part of the Capitoline Museums.

== Criticism ==
In 2013, when referring to the facsimile of the Tomb of Tutankhamun and the facsimile of the caves at Lascaux, historian Tom Holland voiced criticism of the idea of creating "fakes" as a means to protect the originals:

In our society, there is a huge premium set on authenticity. Clearly, were there not a difference between the copy and the original, it wouldn't matter – you could make a replica and trash the original. Tutankhamun and Lascaux were created by people who believed in the world of the spirits, the dead, and the supernatural. You don't have to believe in a god or gods to feel a place is consecrated and has a particular quality that cannot be reproduced.
