= Hanif Kara =

Ugandan-born British structural engineer

Hanif Kara OBE
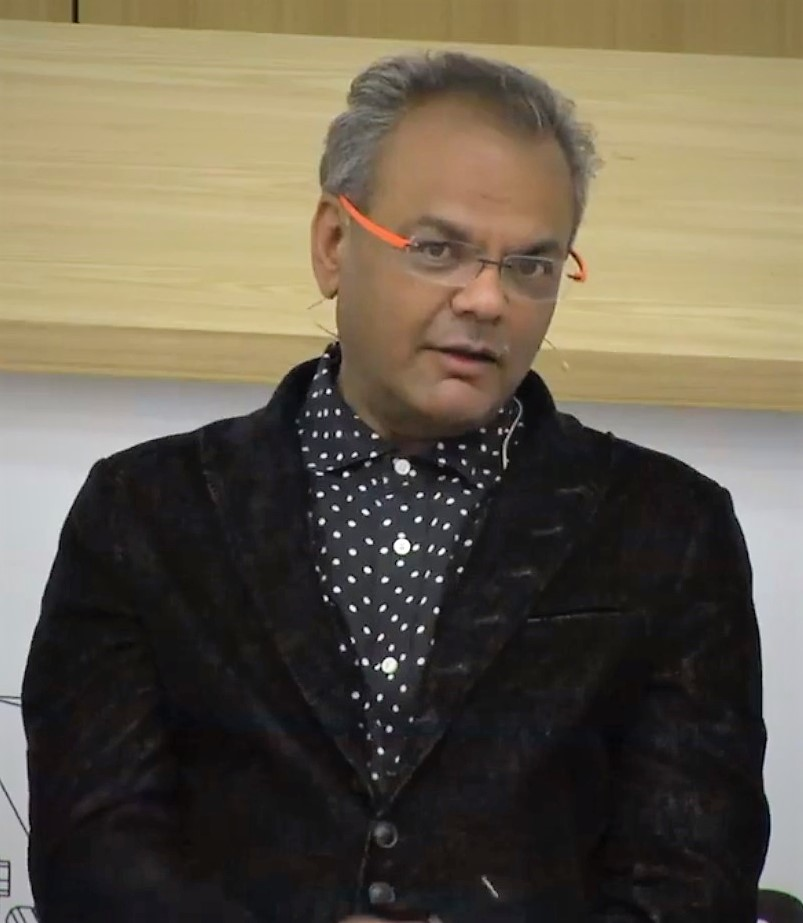
- Kara in 2018
- Born: Bombo, Uganda
- Engineering career
- Discipline: Structural engineer
- Institutions: Fellow of the Institution of Structural Engineers, Fellow of the Institution of Civil Engineers, Honorary fellow of the RIBA, Fellow of the Royal Society of Arts, Fellow of the Royal Academy of Engineering
- Practice name: AKT II

Hanif Mohamed Kara OBE is a structural engineer and is design director and co-founder of London-based structural engineering practice AKT II (previously Adams Kara Taylor). He has taught design internationally, is a member of the board of trustees for the Architecture Foundation and was a commissioner for CABE from 2008 to 2011 (Commission for Architecture and the Built Environment). He is currently Professor in Practice of Architectural Technology at Harvard Graduate School of Design. He also taught as professor of Architectural Technology at KTH Royal Institute of Technology in Stockholm from 2009 until 2012.

== Early life and education ==
Kara was born in Bombo, Uganda. He came to England when he was fourteen, settling with his family in the town of Winsford in Cheshire. He attended Woodford Lodge Comprehensive School. He started his career at Joseph Parks and Son located in Northwich, Cheshire. During his time at Joseph Parks he won a scholarship to Salford University.

== Career ==
Following his graduation in 1982, Kara worked for a structural engineering company Allot and Lomax, where he designed tension structures, roller coasters, offshore platforms and power stations. Kara then worked at Anthony Hunt in London in 1994–1996, before launching AKT in 1996 with Albert Williamson-Taylor and Robin Adams. In 2008, Kara was appointed as a commissioner for British Government watchdog Commission for Architecture and the Built Environment, becoming the first structural engineer to be appointed to this position. At CABE he has chaired the design review panels and has been instrumental in raising the importance of engineering through chairing the Inclusion by Design Group and Energy for Waste Facilities Group. Kara was also appointed a member of Design for London Advisory Group to the Mayor of London, 2007–2008. In 2010 he was appointed to the board of trustees for the Architecture Foundation. Kara was a visiting professor of Architectural Technology at KTH Royal Institute of Technology in Stockholm in Sweden from 2007 until 2012 and teaches design and engineering at GSD Harvard as the Professor in Practice of Architectural Technology. He previously contributed to a quarterly column in the RIBA Journal on issues that affect the industry and has written in many technical journals and books relating to engineering and design.

== Awards and honours ==
Kara was the first structural engineer to be selected for the Master Jury for the 2004 cycle of the Aga Khan Award for Architecture. He is a fellow member of the Royal Institute of British Architects, the Institution of Civil Engineers, the Institution of Structural Engineers and the Royal Society of Arts. Kara was made an Honorary Fellow of the Royal Institute of British Architects in 2004. In 2009 he was curator for the first-ever solo exhibition of the work of AKT at the Architectural Association in London. In May 2011 the Association of Consulting Engineers awarded him the Engineering Ambassador award for his contribution to design consultancy and engineering. In 2014, Kara was made a fellow of the Royal Academy of Engineering. He was awarded the Soane Medal in 2024.

Kara was appointed Officer of the Order of the British Empire (OBE) in the 2022 New Year Honours for services to architecture, engineering and education.

== AKT II (Adams Kara Taylor) ==
AKT II is a structural engineering company based in central London. The company was founded in 1996 by Hanif Kara, Albert Williamson-Taylor and Robin Adams. AKT II is known for its combination of engineering and design processes.

== Selected projects ==
- (TBC) Zayed National Museum, Abu Dhabi, UAE. Architect: Foster + Partners
- 2013 Heydar Aliyev Center, Baku, Azerbaijan. Architect: Zaha Hadid Architects
- 2012 Eli and Edythe Broad Art Museum, East Lansing, MI, US. Architect: Zaha Hadid Architects
- 2011 Sainsbury Laboratory Cambridge University, Cambridge, UK. Architect: Stanton Williams
- 2010 UK pavilion at Expo 2010, Shanghai, China. Architect: Thomas Heatherwick
- 2010 Masdar Institute of Science and Technology, Abu Dhabi, UAE. Architect: Foster + Partners
- 2010 Ravensbourne College, Greenwich, UK. Architect: Foreign Office Architects
- 2009 Hunsett Mill, Norfolk, UK. Architect: ACME
- 2008 Highcross Quarter, Leicester, UK. Architect: Foreign Office Architects
- 2007 East Beach Café, Littlehampton, UK. Architect: Heatherwick Studio
- 2005 Phaeno Science Centre, Wolfsburg, Germany. Architect: Zaha Hadid Architects
- 2005 Blizard Building, London, UK. Architect: Alsop Architects
- 2004 Cadogan Hall, London, UK. Architect: Paul Davis & Partners
- 1999 Peckham Library, London, UK. Architect: Alsop & Störmer
