= AKT II =

Engineering consultants based in London, England

Tyréns AKT
- Predecessor: AKT II
- Formation: 1996
- Founder: Robin Adams; Hanif Kara; Albert Williamson-Taylor
- Type: Limited company
- Headquarters: Elder Yard, Norton Folgate, London, England
- Services: Consulting Engineers
- Fields: Construction
- Subsidiaries: Tyréns AKT Envelopes
- Staff: 350 (2020)
- Website: www.tyrensakt.com
- Formerly called: Adams Kara Taylor; AKT II

Tyréns AKT is a London based firm of structural, civil and transportation engineering consultants. It was founded as Adams Kara Taylor in 1996 by Hanif Kara, Albert Williamson-Taylor (an Honorary Fellow of the Royal Institute of British Architects since 2009) and Robin Adams. Now numbering over 350 employees, it is one of the largest structural engineers in London.

== History ==
Originally founded as Adams Kara Taylor in 1996, Hanif Kara, Albert Williamson-Taylor and Robin Adams were joined by new principals Paul Scott and Gerry O'Brien in 2011 when the practice was renamed AKT II.

The façade engineering consultancy service AKT II Envelopes was founded in 2015 to draw upon the past experience of the parent company.

In 2016 the practice celebrated its 20th year in business, and following completion of the White Collar Factory project Old Street in 2017, AKT II relocated its headquarters to the building in May.

AKT II regularly collaborates with academic institutions such as Harvard Graduate School of Design, the Architectural Association and KTH Royal Institute of Technology in Stockholm, as well as industry institutions including CABE, BCO, and the Architecture Foundation.

== Projects ==
Since its inception, AKT II has contributed to projects in the UK and internationally, spanning five continents, with architects such as Allford Hall Monaghan Morris, Bjarke Ingels Group, David Chipperfield, Feilden Clegg Bradley Studios, Foreign Office Architects, Foster + Partners, Thomas Heatherwick and Zaha Hadid.

AKT II designed the Francis Crick Institute with HOK and the Birmingham New Street railway station redevelopment with AZPML, the latter receiving the 2016 Institution of Structural Engineers' Structural Awards for Infrastructure or Transportation Structures.

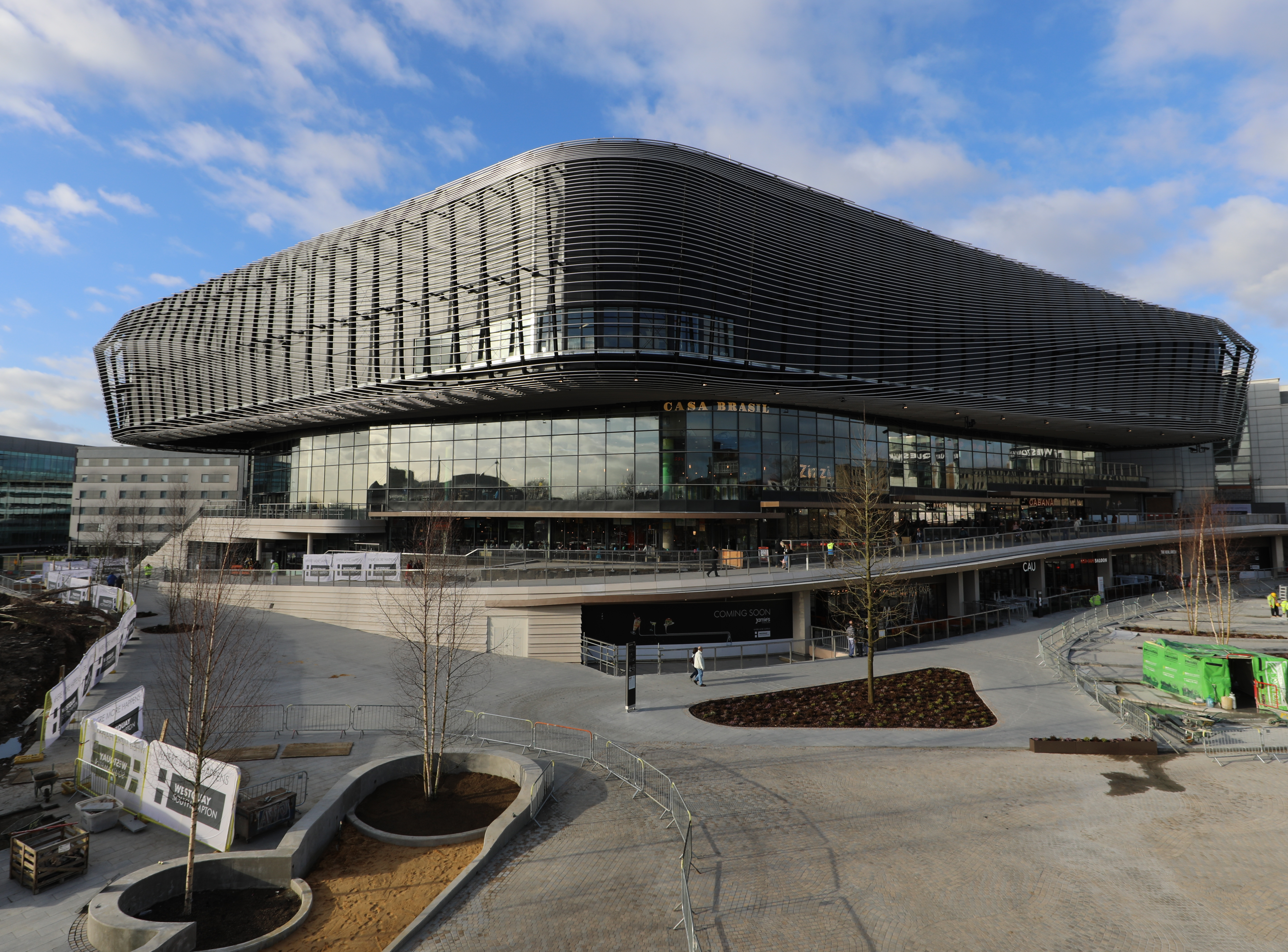
Westquay Watermark, Southampton, England

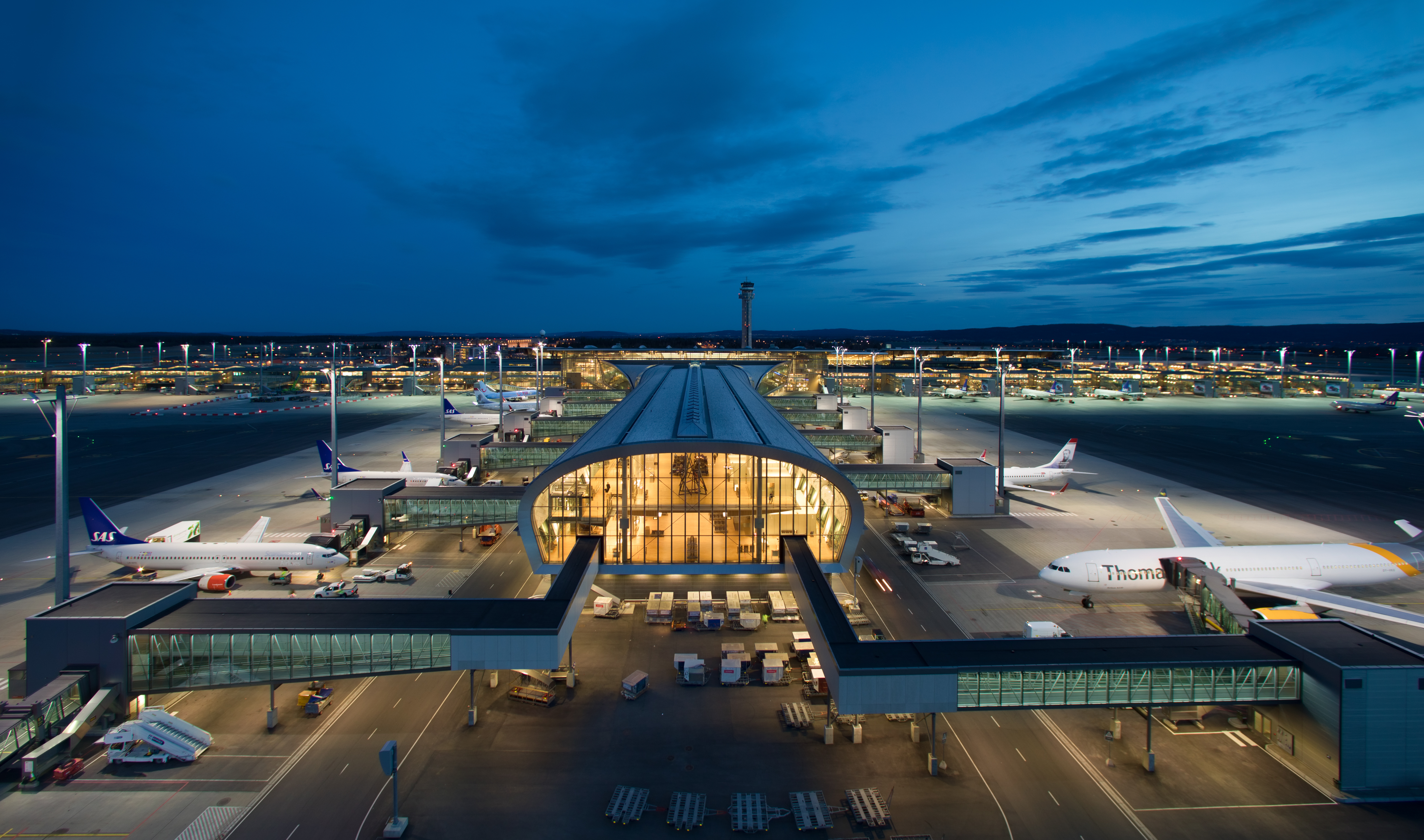
Oslo Airport, Gardermoen, Norway

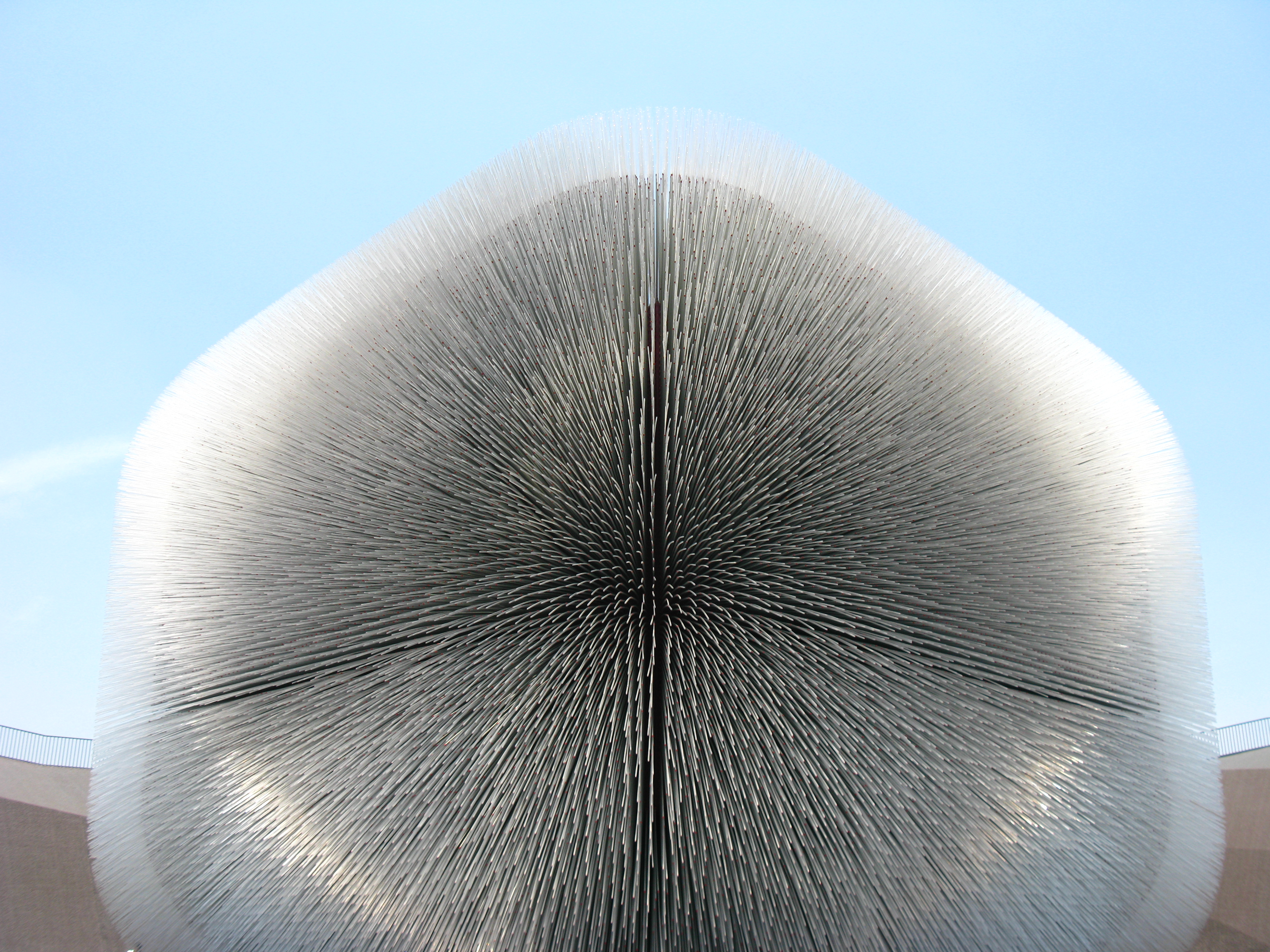
UK pavilion at Expo 2010, Shanghai, China

=== UK projects ===
- 105 Victoria Street, London (2026, architect: KPF)
- Edge London Bridge, London (2026, architect: Pilbrow and Partners)
- 99 Bishopsgate, London (ongoing, architect: RSHP)
- Google King's Cross, London (2026, architect: BIG - Bjarke Ingels Group and Heatherwick Studio)
- Wood Wharf, London (ongoing, architect: various)
- Whiteleys, London (2025, architect: Foster + Partners)
- One Nine Elms, London (2024, architect: KPF)
- One Grosvenor Square, London, (2020, architect: EPR Architects)
- King's Cross Central, London (ongoing, architect: various)
- Bloomberg European HQ, London (2018, architect: Foster + Partners)
- Westquay Watermark, Southampton, (2017, architect: ACME)
- One Rathbone Square, London, (2017, architect: MAKE Architects)
- Serpentine Pavilion, London (2016, architect: BIG)
- The Francis Crick Institute, London (2016, architect: HOK)
- South Bank Tower, London (2015, architect: KPF)
- Birmingham New Street railway station, Birmingham (2015, architect: AZPML)
- Merchant Square Footbridge, London (2014, architect: Knight Architects)
- Sainsbury Laboratory, Cambridge (2011, architect: Stanton Williams)
- Ravensbourne College, London (2010, architect: Foreign Office Architects)
- Hunsett Mill, Norfolk (2009, architect: ACME)
- Highcross, Leicester (2008, architect: Foreign Office Architects)
- East Beach Café, Littlehampton (2007, architect: Heatherwick Studio)
- Blizard Building, London (2005, architect: Alsop Architects)
- Cadogan Hall, London (2004, architect: PDP London)
- Peckham Library, London (1999, architect: Alsop & Störmer)

=== Notable international projects ===
- Zayed National Museum, Abu Dhabi, UAE (ongoing, architect: Foster + Partners)
- Vessel, New York City, NY, USA (ongoing, architect: Heatherwick Studio)
- Napoli Afragola railway station, Naples, Italy (ongoing, architect: Zaha Hadid Architects)
- Oslo Airport Terminal 2, Gardermoen, Oslo (2017, architect: Nordic — Office of Architecture)
- Eastland Shopping Centre, Melbourne, Australia (2015, architect: ACME)
- Heydar Aliyev Cultural Center, Baku, Azerbaijan (2013, architect: Zaha Hadid Architects)
- Eli and Edythe Broad Art Museum, East Lansing, MI, USA (2012, architect: Zaha Hadid Architects)
- Maharashtra Cricket Association Stadium, Pune, India (2012, architect: Hopkins Architects)
- UK pavilion at Expo 2010, Shanghai, China (2010, architect: Thomas Heatherwick)
- Masdar Institute of Science and Technology, Abu Dhabi, UAE (2010, architect: Foster + Partners)
- Henderson Waves, Singapore (2008, architect: IJP Corporation)
- Phæno Science Center, Wolfsburg, Germany (2005, architect: Zaha Hadid Architects)
- Red Sea Hotel 12, Saudi Arabia, Saudi Arabia (2023, architect: Foster + Partners)

== Awards ==
In both 2016 and 2017, AKT II featured on New Civil Engineer's Top 100 civil engineering firms to work for and with, coming 13th in both years and winning the Global Firm of the Year Award in 2017. They were also UK Consultants of the Year (under 250 employees) at the 2015 NCE/ACE Consultants Awards. In 2019, the practice won Building Magazine's Engineering Consultants of the Year award.

AKT II has supported projects which to date have won more than 350 design awards including four Stirling Prizes (Peckham Library in 2000, Sainsbury Laboratory in 2012, Bloomberg European HQ in 2018 and Kingston Town House in 2021), the RIBA Manser Medal 2010 for Hunsett Mill, and the RIBA Lubetkin Prize 2010 for the UK Pavilion, Shanghai Expo. Other prominent wins include over ten BCI Awards, including the Judges' Special Award for the Angel Building and the Prime Minister's Better Public Building Award for Five Pancras Square, and IStructE Structural Awards for Birmingham New Street station, Chenil House and Phæno Science Center.

== Publications ==
- Design Engineering (Actar, 2008) – This publication explores the first ten years of Adams Kara Taylor's existence, becoming one of the most innovative engineering firms working today.
- Design Engineering Refocused (Wiley, 2016) – This books draws upon AKT II's second decade to explore how the role of the design engineer has evolved, illustrating examples of interdisciplinary interactions and revealing the processes that challenge conventions of traditional and new modes of practice.
