= Susanna Heron =

British site-specific artist

- Henslow's Walk 2011 by Susanna Heron, Sainsbury Laboratory, Cambridge
- Born: 1949 (age 76–77); Welwyn Garden City, Hertfordshire
- Education: Central Saint Martins
- Known for: Drawing Sculpture
- Awards: Honorary Fellow of the RIBA
- Website: www.susannaheron.com

Susanna Heron (born 1949) hon FRIBA is a British site-specific artist recognised for her work in stone relief. Her best known works include Stone Drawing for St John's College, Oxford, completed in 2019, and Henslow's Walk at Sainsbury Laboratory, University of Cambridge, winner of the Stirling Prize 2012.

== Biography ==
Heron was born in Welwyn Garden City in 1949. Her family moved from London to Eagles Nest, Zennor, Cornwall in 1955. She is the younger daughter of the painter Patrick Heron and Delia Heron (née Reiss) and sister of architect Katharine Heron. She was educated at Penzance Girls Grammar School and studied at Falmouth School of Art (1967–68) and Central School of Art and Design, London (1968–1971). Since 1978 the artist has lived and worked in the East End of London. She moved to her present studio in Shoreditch in 2006.

== Early career ==
Between 1970 and 1983 Heron received international recognition as a major presence in British New Jewellery. Heron was awarded a UK/US Bicentennial Arts Fellowship (British Council/N.E.A.) in 1977 to travel and work in the USA for one year. Following this period, a series of works emerged entitled The Wearables, consisting of flat discs tied to the body. The Wearables were exhibited on the wall alongside photographs, created with David Ward, of the pieces being worn. Heron and Ward co-curated a collection of radical, wearable objects by different artists exhibited as The Jewellery Project at the Crafts Council in 1983.

Her transition into sculpture followed; Heron "… was interested in jewellery as a way of making work that was accessible and unpretentious, something to be used in everyday life … This belief in her practice as a part of life and the concern for the application of art to different situations, beyond the gallery and the art world, has persisted in the more recent public works."

== Exhibitions ==
Heron’s first exhibition of sculpture was shown at the Whitechapel Art Gallery in 1985, displaying wall works with small sculptures including Frieze (1983–84), a series of small gilded silver shapes with a circle in common, "Heron's first fully mature statement". This was followed by exhibitions at Plymouth Arts Centre (1986), The Showroom (1987), Camden Arts Centre (1989), and Newlyn Art Gallery (1992)

A defining group of works at this time entitled Shima included small bronze sculptures, cibachrome photographs, and an artist's book Shima: Island and Garden, each represented in the Arts Council Collection. The works came out of Heron’s involvement in the regeneration of the garden at Eagles Nest in 1987 following a severe frost and "… concern things unseen, buried, underground, internal, subconscious; involving sources of energy, generators, messengers, nerves and roots".

In 2003 Heron installed wall drawings for her exhibition Elements at the Mead Gallery, Warwick Arts Centre, which originated in 36 painted drawings in black, made for a commission in Tokyo in 2001. The same drawings were recreated as tiny woodcuts in Japan, the Palm Prints, part of a body of work to be transformed through location, scale and substance. "Like mathematical systems, they are elements, essences, reproducible at any size … but the experience of the works is specific, rooted in a particular time and place."

== Selected site specific works ==
Slate Frieze, Detail, 1993

In 1993 Heron was awarded her first site specific commission Slate Frieze, 23 rectangular slabs of engraved slate over a 21m length wall, installed at the Council of the European Union, Brussels in 1995.

A series of high profile commissions followed including Waterwindow, part of the Phoenix Initiative (a Millennium Urban Regeneration Scheme), a waterfall and window sited at the change in levels in Priory Place, Coventry. The splash from the waterfall is continuously recorded in the build-up of green patina on copper panels, evolving and changing over time to form a water-sensitive drawing. Heron was made an honorary Fellow of the Royal Institute of British Architects in 1999 for her contributions to architecture.

In 2009 Heron was commissioned to make a new work entitled Henslow's Walk for the Sainsbury Laboratory, University of Cambridge with Stanton Williams, winner of the Stirling Prize in 2012. The work comprises four double images carved in shallow relief on a 22m length interior wall; inspired by John Stevens Henslow and his collations of native plants. "Employing her favoured medium of drawings in shallow relief, Heron has created a backdrop to the Laboratory's lecture theatre intricately carved into the yellow French limestone, which forms part of the fabric of the building."

Heron collaborated with Bennetts Associates between 2012-15 to make Travertine Frieze, a shallow carving in negative relief of floor to ceiling drawn lines. It forms the side wall to the main entrance of 40 Chancery Lane cut in travertine marble. (Winner of RIBA London Award 2017 and RIBA National Award 2017).

Heron continues her interest in large scale stone relief with a commission for St John's College, Oxford, with Wright & Wright Architects. Stone Drawing, cut from Clipsham stone, occupies both the external and internal faces to the wall of a new study centre at St John's College Library adjacent to the baroque Canterbury Quad. At 6 metres high and 20.4 metres long, it forms the west side of the new building. The work is in part derived from a series of small painted red drawings in oil paint incorporating abstract profiles and sequences.

"A negative relief, like an engraving, is carved from a flat surface. Each line becomes an edge, or more accurately two or even three edges, whether it becomes a step or a groove. In this way it relates to maps and plans, terrain viewed from above where visibility is often reliant on direction of light and vantage point. It is subject to reversal and plays tricks with your eyes – something that projects might appear to recede when the light changes."

== Major works ==
- Stone Drawing at St John's College Oxford (2014-2019)
- Travertine Frieze at Chancery Lane London (2012-2014)
- Henslow's Walk in Sainsbury Laboratory University of Cambridge, University of Cambridge Botanic Garden (2008-2011)
- Roche for the facade of the House of Fraser in Cabot Circus, Bristol (2005-2008)
- Still Point in the grounds of Liverpool Metropolitan Cathedral, Liverpool (2004-2007)
- Aquaduct in the Brunswick Centre, Bloomsbury London (2003-2006)
- Elements, Warwick Arts Centre, Coventry (2002)
- 36 Elements in the Marunouchi Building, Tokyo (2001-2002)
- Side Street at City Inn, Westminster London (2001-2003)
- Waterwindow in Priory Place Coventry (1998-2003)
- Sunken Courtyard in Hackney Community College London (1995-1997)
- Island at British Embassy Dublin (1994-1995)
- Slate Frieze in the Council of the European Union, Brussels (1993-1995)
- Shima 1988 purchased by the Arts Council Collection
