= Luke Hughes (furniture designer) =

British furniture designer

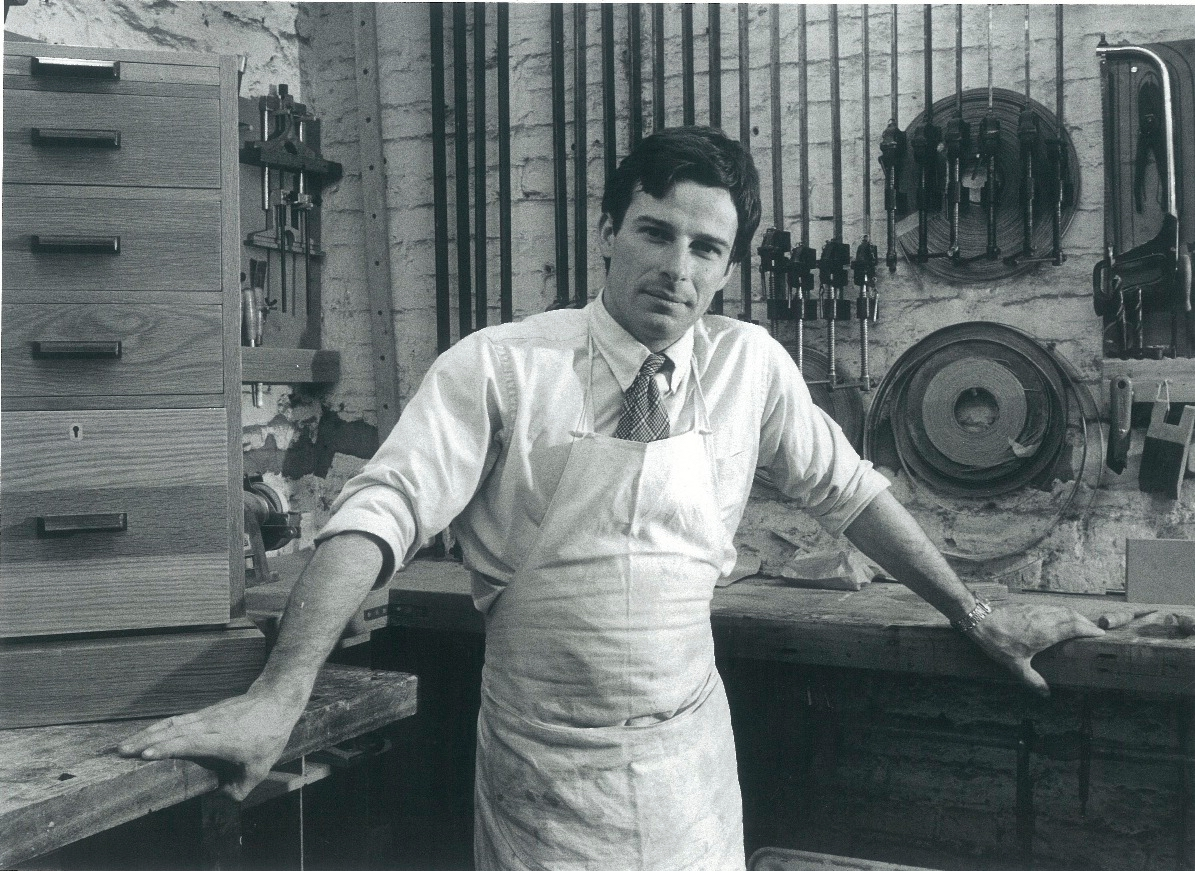
Luke Hughes in the Stukeley Street workshop, c. 1987

Luke Hughes is an English furniture designer specialising in furniture for public buildings including Westminster Abbey.

== Career ==
Hughes was temporarily working as a carpenter on London building sites in 1979 when chosen to lead a design project for kitchen shelving, which led further to the refurbishment of the client's home library. This was the first library project that led to a series of bookcase designs and installations for Inns of Court lawyers. He set up his first company, Bloomsbury Joinery, in 1980 in Lamb's Conduit Street, Bloomsbury.

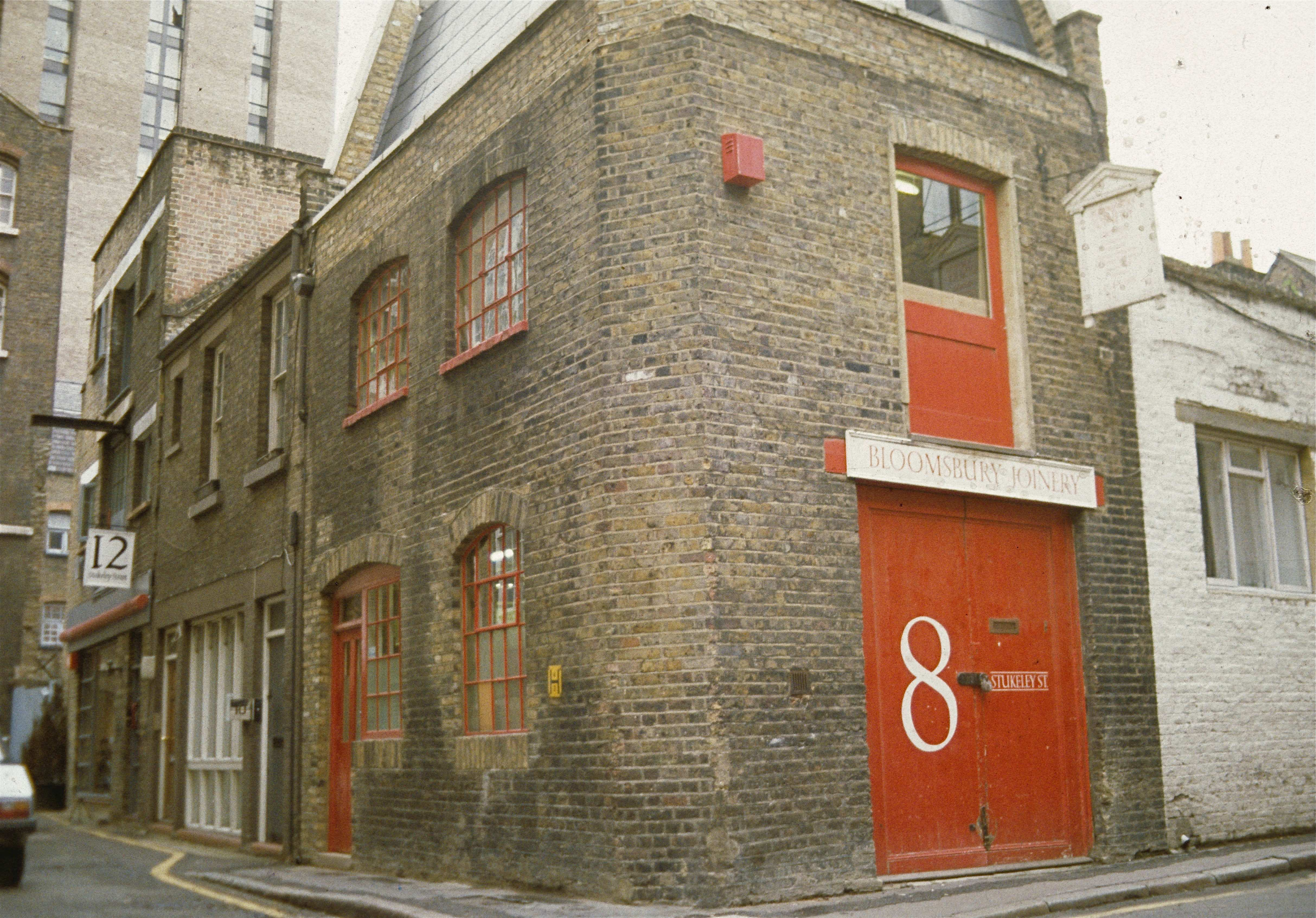
Workshop in Stukeley Street, c. 1982

Hughes is the founder and CEO of Luke Hughes and Company Limited, which went out of business in May 2024. Luke Hughes’ early output consisted of furniture for the residential market. The same period also saw Hughes’ short-lived engagement with designing for the retail market. This came in the form of the ill-fated Ovolo line of bedroom furniture, originally manufactured by a Birmingham reproduction furniture company, Juckes, and sold through Heal's, Liberty's and John Lewis. The line's failure to gain a foothold with the consumer forced a change to the targeting of institutional clients. To that end, Hughes brought architect and former managing director of Cotswold Furniture Manufacturers, Gordon Russell, on board.

== Selected projects ==
- Chapel of the Resurrection, Valparaiso University, Indiana was furnished with an updated and re-engineered version of ‘the Coventry Chair’ designed originally by Richard "Dick" Russell in 1960.
- St Giles Edinburgh – a new Holy Table in hand-tooled Carrara marble.
- Sheffield Cathedral, stacking benches.
- The Supreme Court of the United Kingdom The library houses 35,000 books in a space intended for less than 25,000.
- The Sainsbury Laboratory, University of Cambridge Botanic Institute; LHCL devised a range of furniture for this, with stainless steel frames, leather upholstery and timber veneered workstations.
- In 1997, the firm made a desk for the British Embassy Moscow.
