= Sainsbury Laboratory Cambridge University =

Research institute at the University of Cambridge

Coordinates: 52.19475°N 0.12777°E

The Sainsbury Laboratory, Cambridge
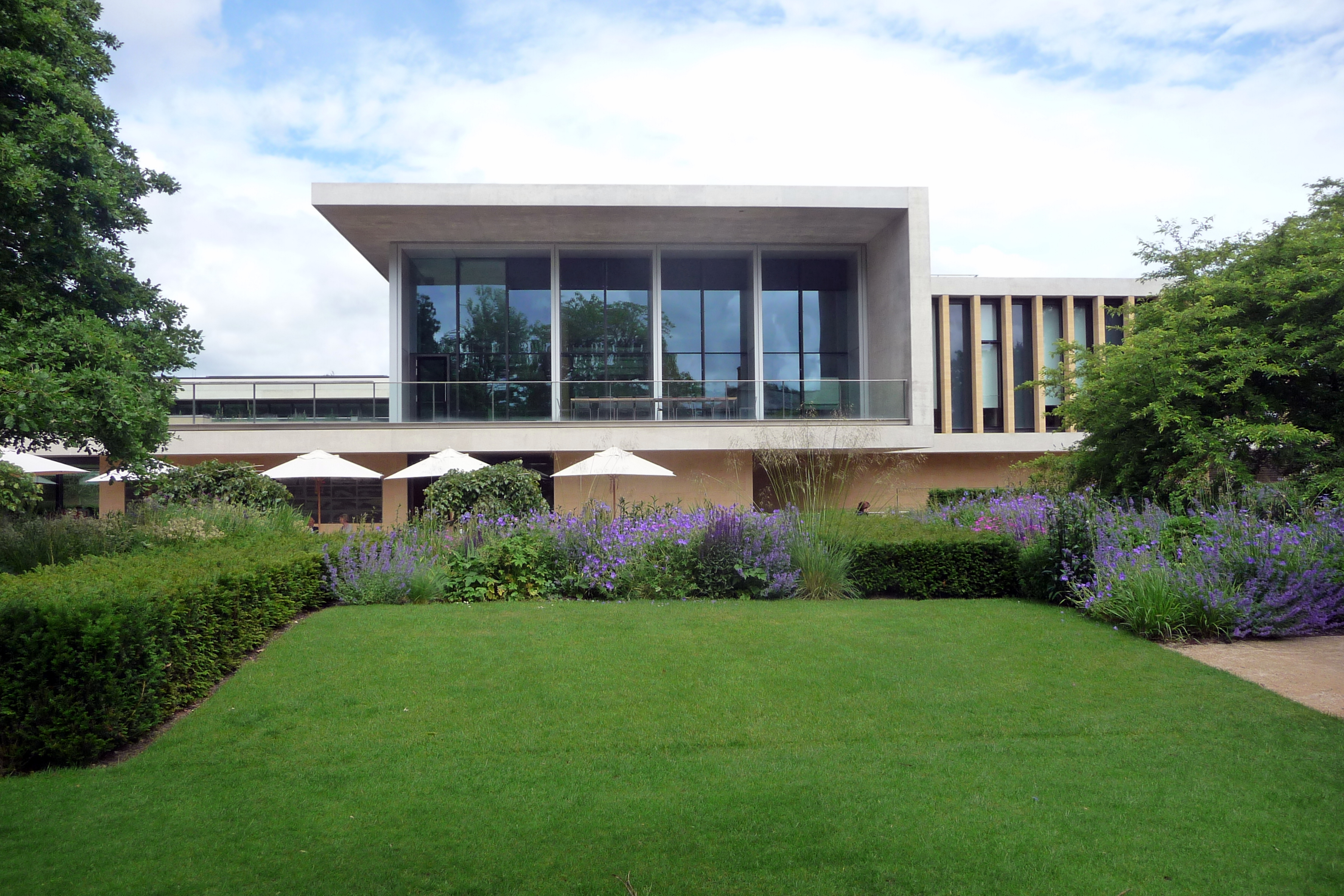
- Exterior of the Sainsbury Laboratory from the Cambridge University Botanic Garden
- Academic affiliations: University of Cambridge
- Endowment: Gatsby Charitable Foundation
- Director: Henrik Jönsson
- Location: Cambridge, England
- Architect: Stanton Williams
- Structural Engineer: AKT II
- Website: www.slcu.cam.ac.uk

The Sainsbury Laboratory Cambridge University (or SLCU) is a British research institute, which is funded by the Gatsby Charitable Foundation. Its "aim is to understand the regulatory systems underlying plant growth and plant development."

The "state-of-the-art" research facility, completed in 2011, is located at the Cambridge University Botanic Garden.

== Sainsbury Laboratory Research Groups ==
As of 2025, the research groups at Sainsbury Laboratory are:

- Bartlett Research Group (led by Dr. Madelaine Bartlett) — focusing on the genetic basis of plant development and how these genes have changed during morphological evolution.
- Bhatia Research Group (led by Dr. Neha Bhatia) — focusing on investigating how the plant hormone cytokinin coordinates cell division and specialization during the development of plant aerial organs.
- Jones Research Group (led by Dr. Alexander Jones) — focusing on studying how plant hormones integrate various signals and act as central regulators for overall plant function and growth.
- Jönsson Research Group (led by Professor Henrik Jönsson, SLCU Director) — focusing on developing computational and mathematical models at the cellular level to describe the self-organization and complex dynamics of multicellular plant tissues.
- Locke Research Group (led by Professor James Locke, SLCU Associate Director) — focusing on analyzing the dynamics of gene expression in various microbial and plant systems.
- Meyerowitz Research Group (led by Professor Elliot Meyerowitz, Inaugural Director, Distinguished Associate) — focusing on combining real-time live imaging, mathematical models, and experiments to understand the development of flowers and shoot meristems.
- Moyroud Research Group (led by Dr. Edwige Moyroud) — focusing on researching the molecular, cellular, biophysical, and ecological mechanisms that determine pattern formation in petals.
- Nédélec Research Group (led by Dr. François Nédélec) — focusing on studying cell morphogenesis and developmental biology using biophysical approaches, systems biology, mathematical modeling and computer simulations.
- Robinson Research Group (led by Dr. Sarah Robinson) — focusing on investigating the control of plant development (cell division and expansion) through biophysical tools, genetics, and mathematical modeling.
- Schiessl Research Group (led by Dr. Katharina Schiessl) — focusing on using plant organs formed by microbes (like root nodules and galls) to understand the general principles governing the diversification of plant organs.
- Schornack Research Group (led by Professor Sebastian Schornack) — focusing on characterizing the extent to which beneficial and harmful microorganisms use similar plant developmental processes for colonisation.
- Vroomans Research Group (led by Dr. Renske Vroomans) — focusing on studying long-term plant development processes using evolutionary developmental biology (evo-devo) models.
- Whitewoods Research Group (led by Dr. Chris Whitewoods) — focusing on how plants pattern themselves in three dimensions.

== History ==
The Sainsbury Laboratory houses 120 plant scientists studying plant development and diversity in state-of-the-art laboratory facilities. The building was made possible by the award of an £82 million grant from the Gatsby Charitable Foundation, one of the Sainsbury family charitable trusts. The work of the laboratory complements that of the Sainsbury Laboratory at Norwich.

Construction of the 11,000-square metre building, led by Kier Group, began in the private working and research area of the Botanic Garden in February 2008 and was completed in December 2010. The building was opened on 27 April 2011 by Elizabeth II.

The laboratory building also provides plant growth facilities and a home for the University Herbarium, which contains over one million pressed and dried plant specimens from around the world, including the great majority of those collected by Charles Darwin on the Beagle Voyage, and scientific research material relating to newly discovered plants from the 18th and 19th centuries.

== Building ==
The Laboratory meets Cambridge City Council’s planning requirement for 10% renewable on-site energy generation through use of photovoltaic panels, and has been awarded a BREEAM 'Excellent' rating. The Gilmour Suite, in a wing of the Sainsbury Laboratory, provides a public café and terrace for Botanic Garden visitors and is open all year during the garden's public opening hours. The building was awarded the Stirling Prize for architecture in 2012.

Architect:	Stanton Williams
Furniture consultant:	Luke Hughes
Construction Start date:	February 2008
Completion Date:	December 2010
Date of Occupation:	January 2011
Number of Occupants:	150
Gross Internal Area:	11,000 m^{2} (120,000 ft^{2})

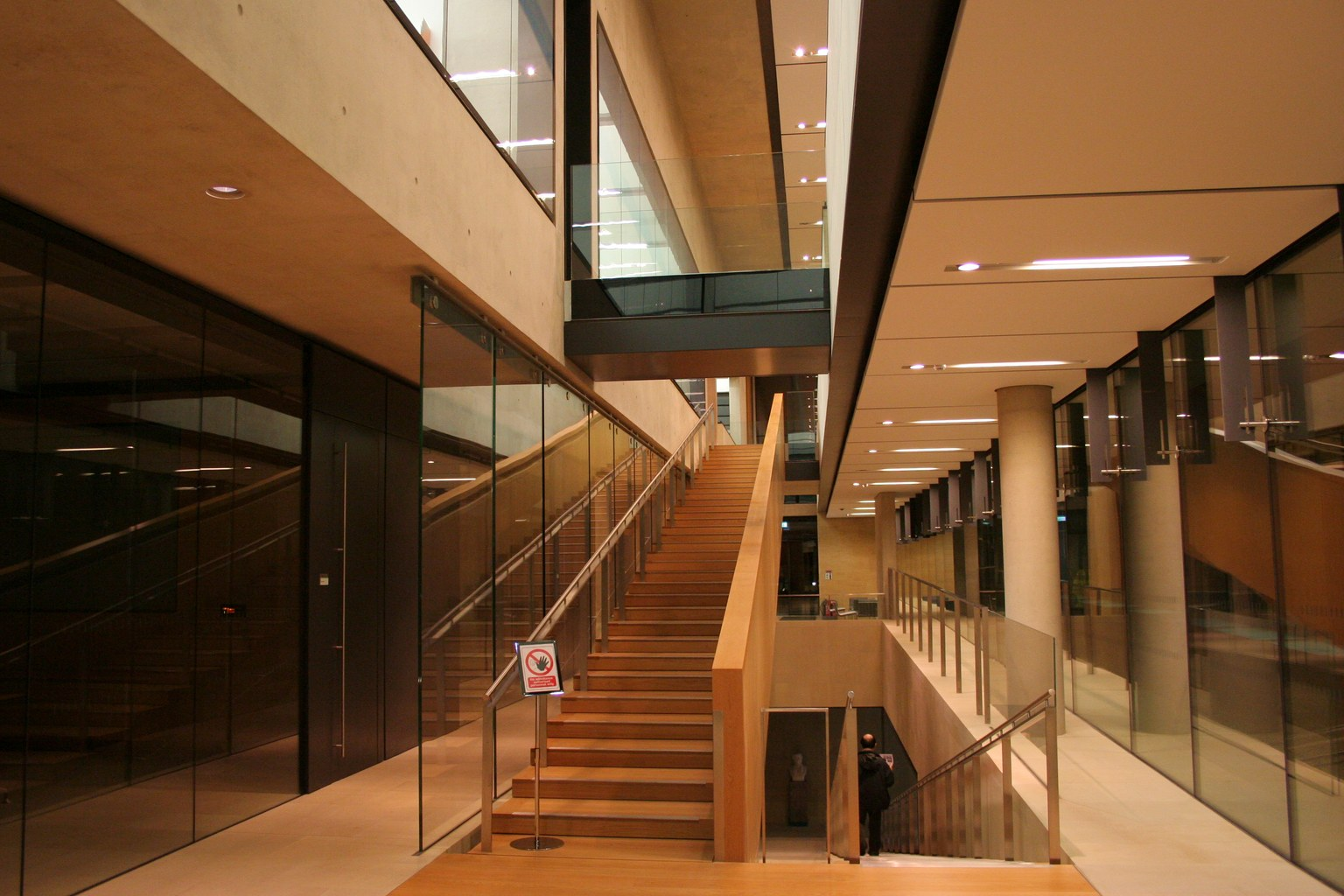
Stairs

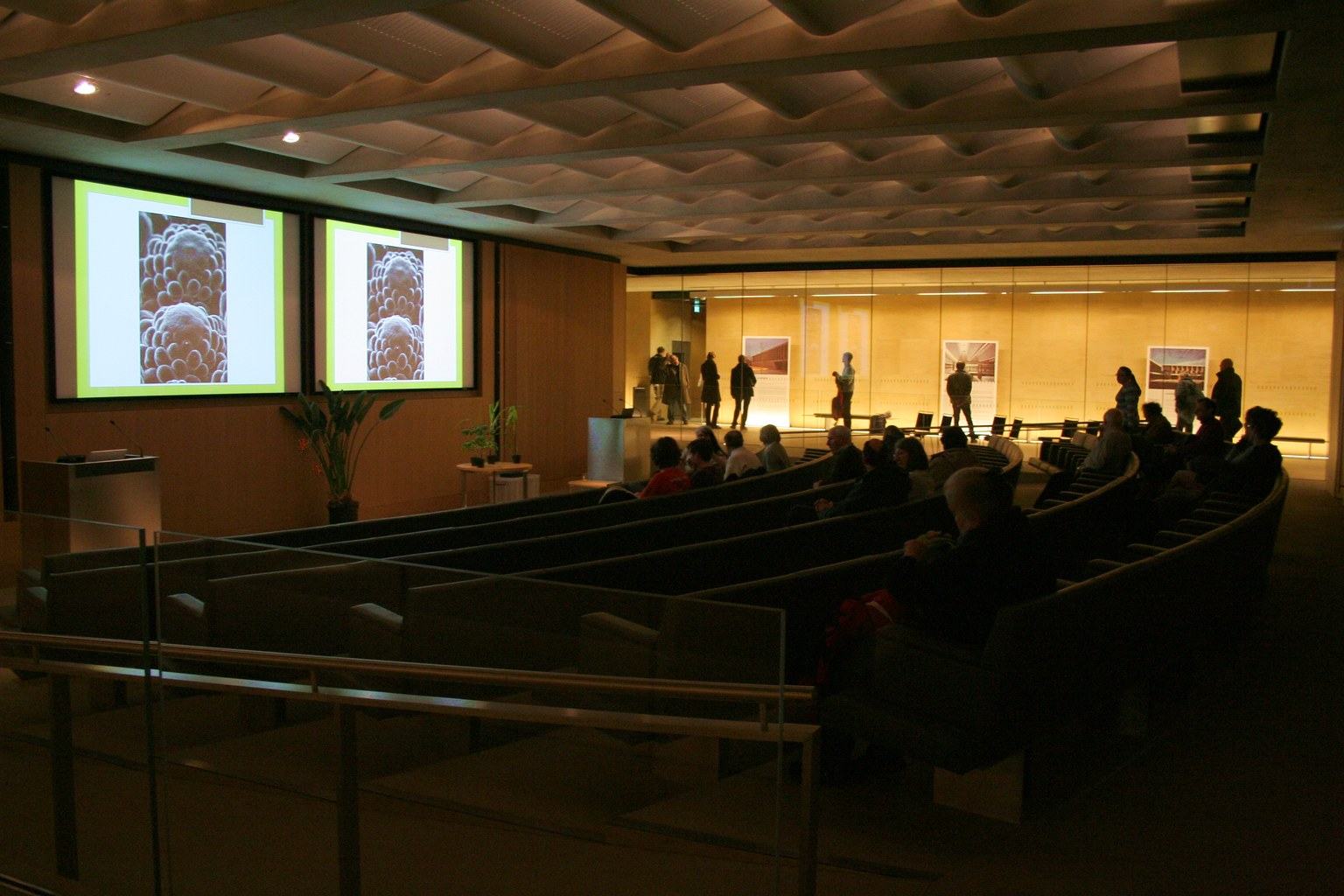
Auditorium

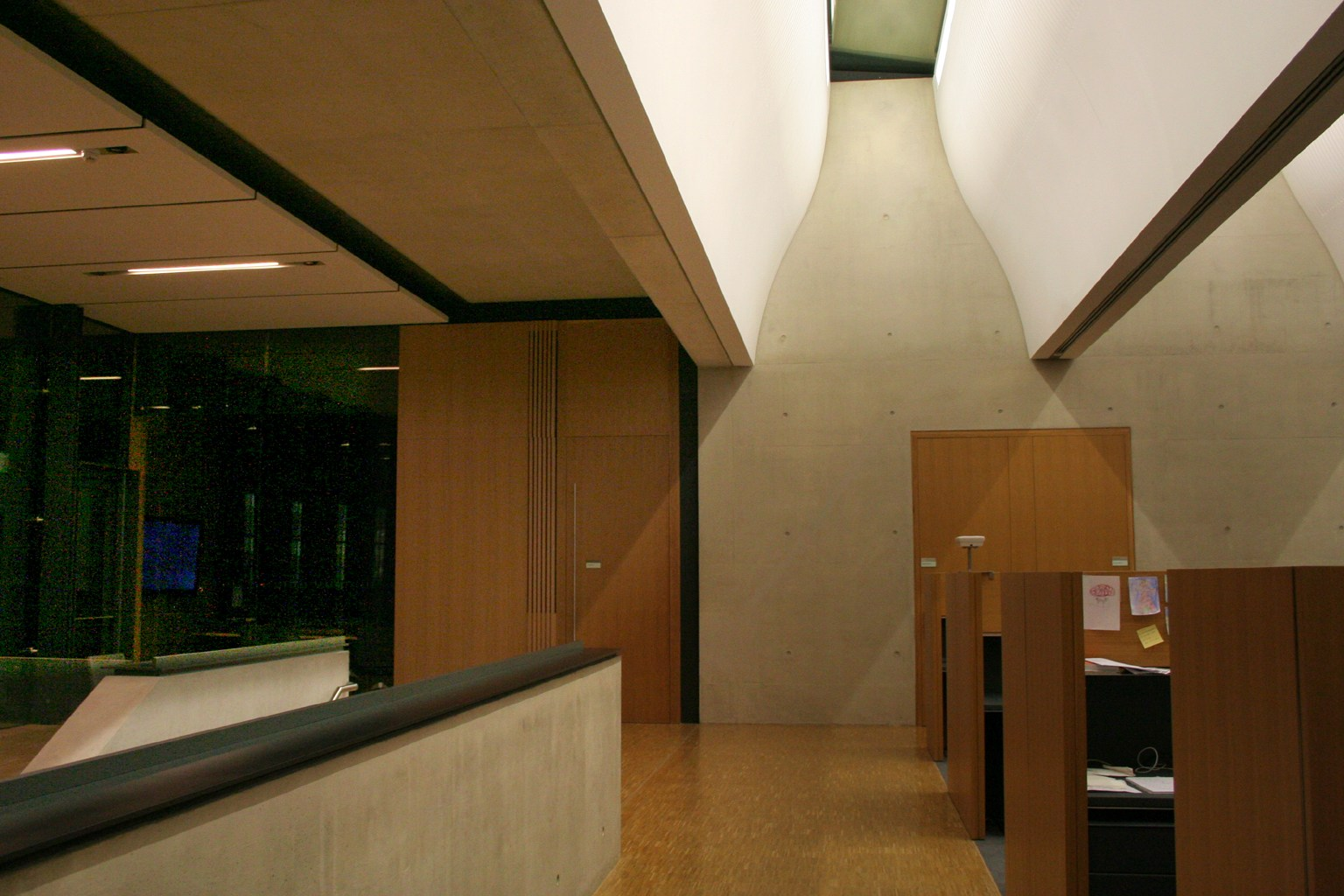
Cubicles

== Artwork ==
The laboratory has several pieces of art, including:

Artist Name	Work
Norman Ackroyd	Galapagos
Susanna Heron	Henslow’s Walk
William Pye	Starburst
