= Peckham Library =

Library in Peckham, London

- 51°28′28″N 0°04′09″W
- Location: Peckham, London, England
- Type: Public Library
- Established: 8 March 2000; 26 years ago

Collection
- Size: 40,848

Other information
- Website: https://www.southwark.gov.uk/libraries

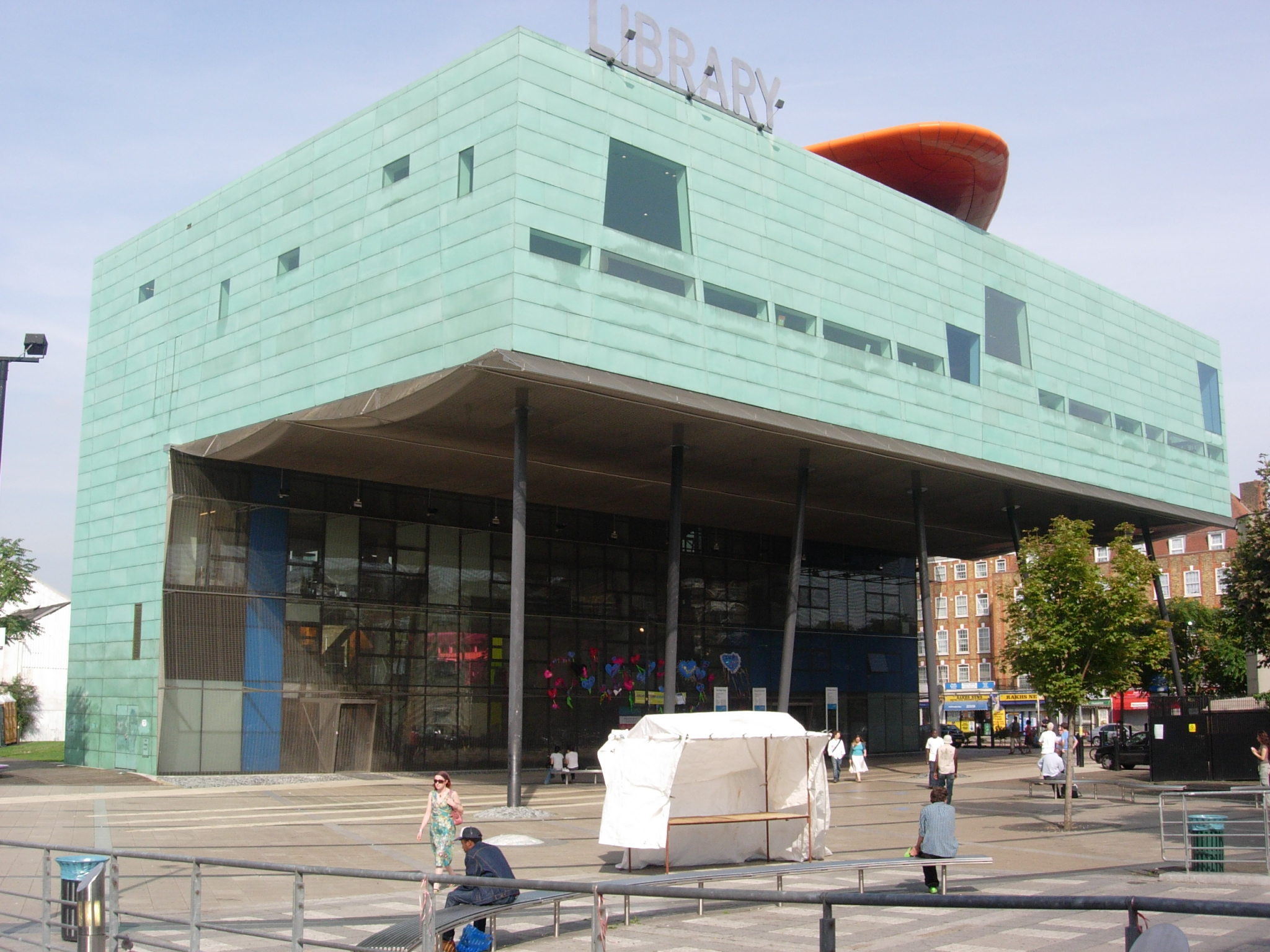
Winner of the Stirling Prize for Architecture

Peckham Library is a library and community building situated in Peckham in south-east London, United Kingdom. It was designed by Alsop and Störmer, engineered by AKT II and won the Stirling Prize for Architecture in 2000.

The building is shaped like an inverted capital letter 'L', with the upper part supported by thin steel pillars set at apparently random angles. The exterior is clad with pre-patinated copper.

The Stirling Prize judges approved the building's approach. Alsop has taken the plan footprint of a conventional library and elevated it to create a public space beneath the building and to remove the quiet reading space from street level noise. The remaining, supporting buildings on the ground and 1st floors house the information and media centre. The building has five floors in total, with the library service taking up the fourth floor.

The library opened to the public on 8 March 2000, with an official opening by Secretary of State for Culture, Media and Sport, Chris Smith, on 15 May 2000.

The building attracts over half a million visitors per year.

SuperC, a student service centre building at the RWTH Aachen in Germany was built in 2006, which has been compared to Peckham Library with a similar L design.

The library features diverse activities for both children and adults.

== Images ==
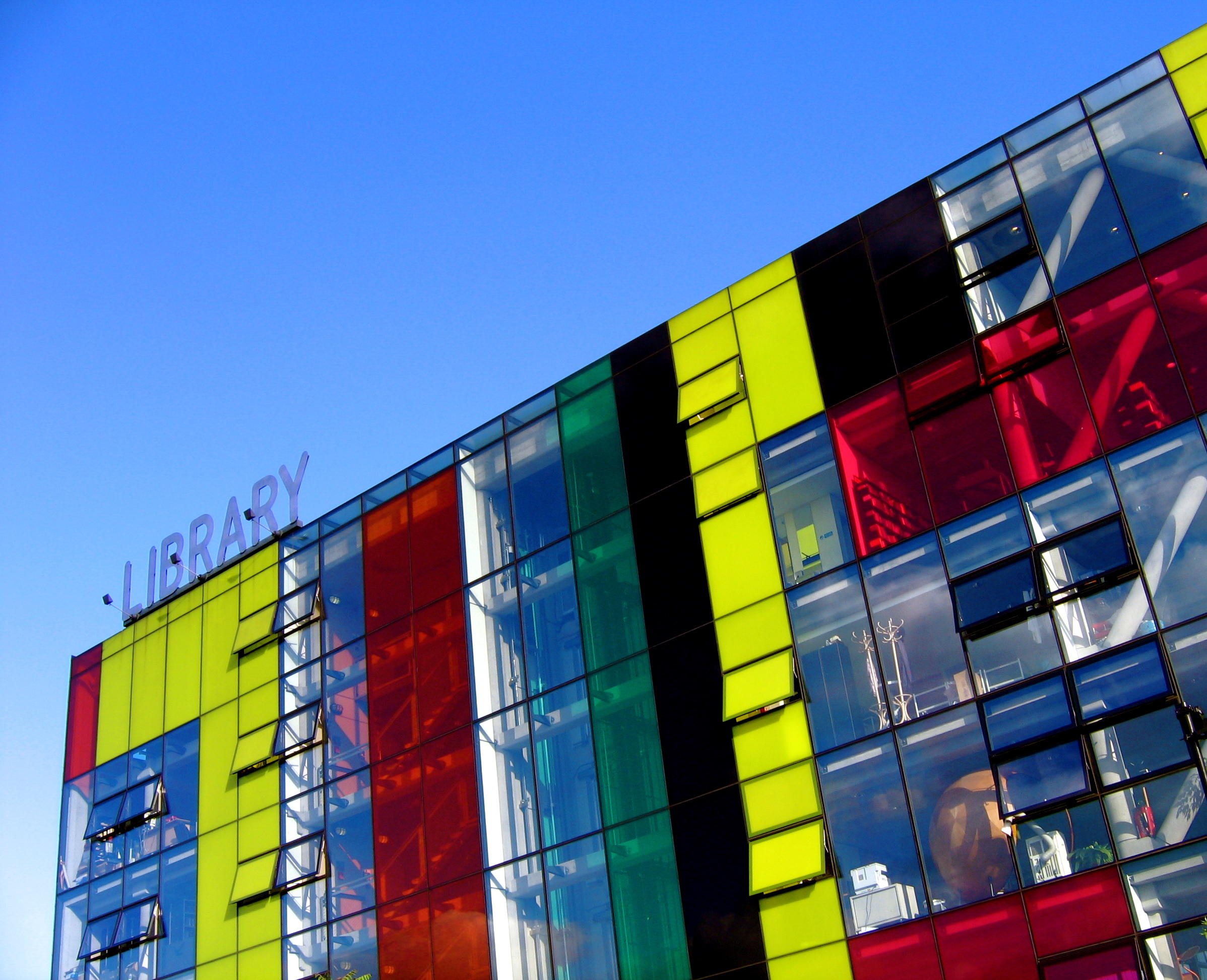
The north facing rear façade of the building.

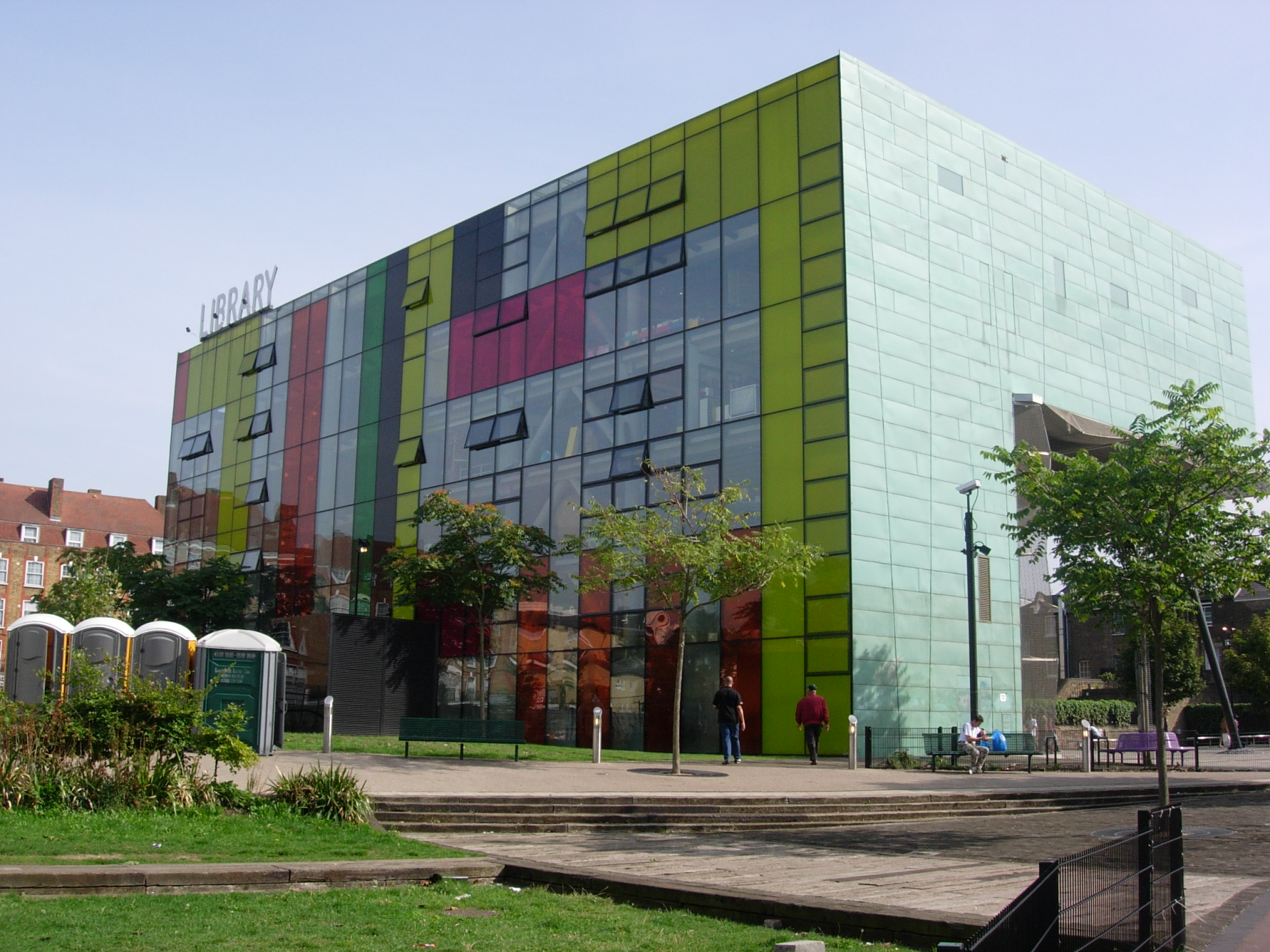
Exterior

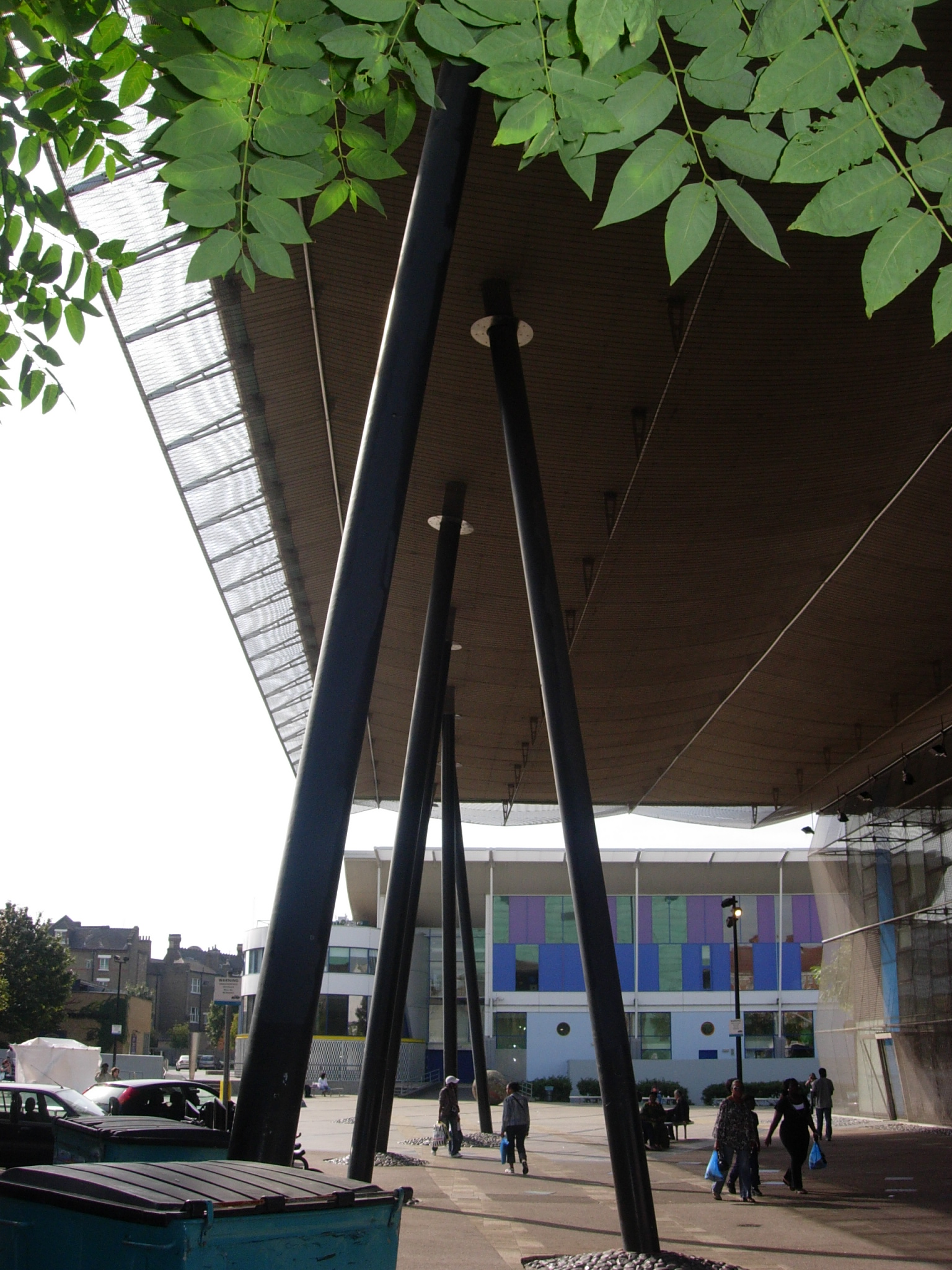
View showing the diagonal columns

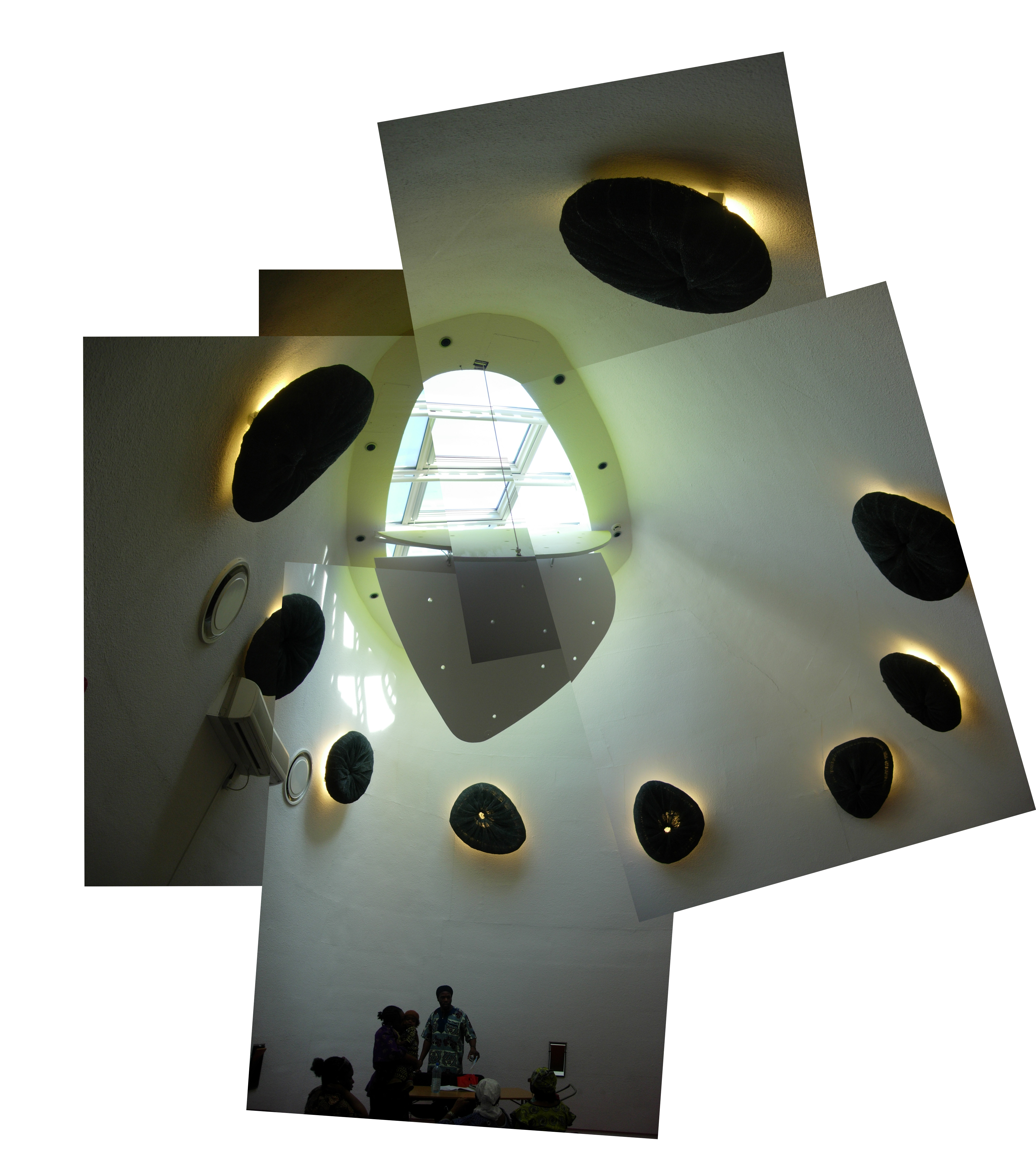
Interior view of meeting room pod

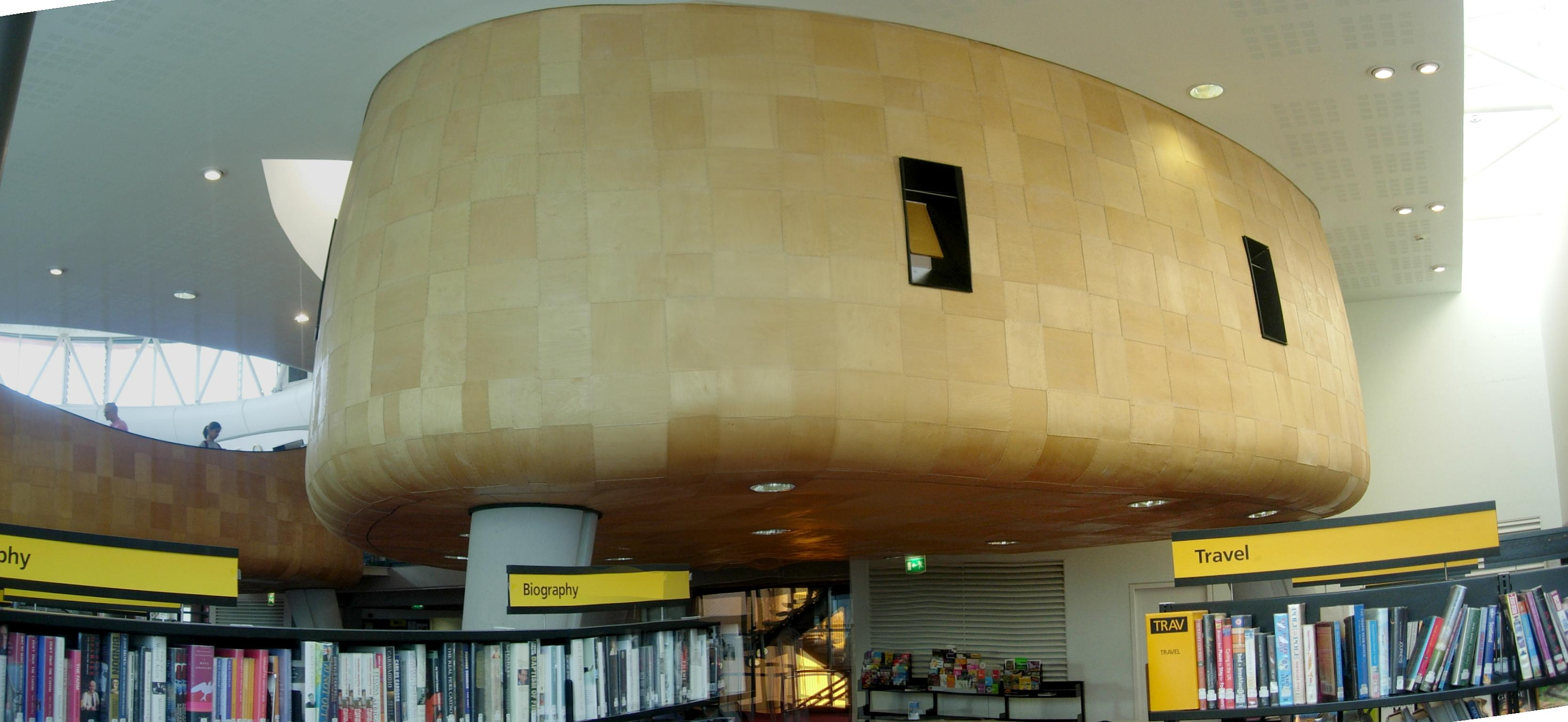
Main library space

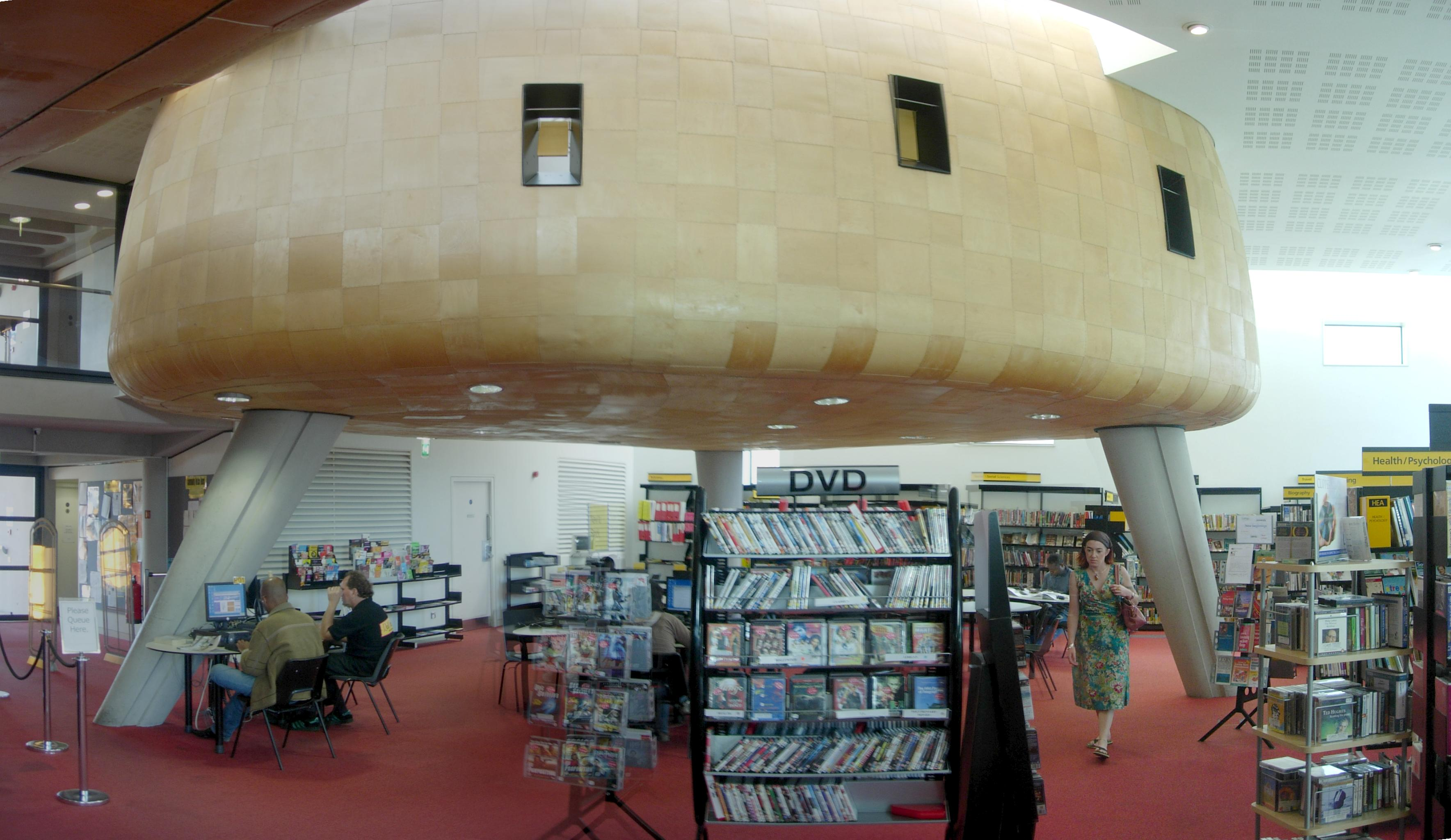
Main library space

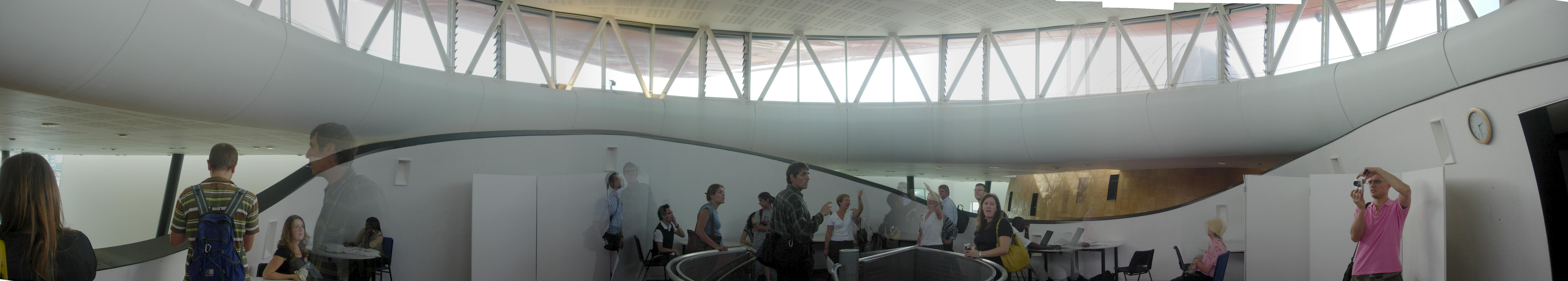
View of central pod

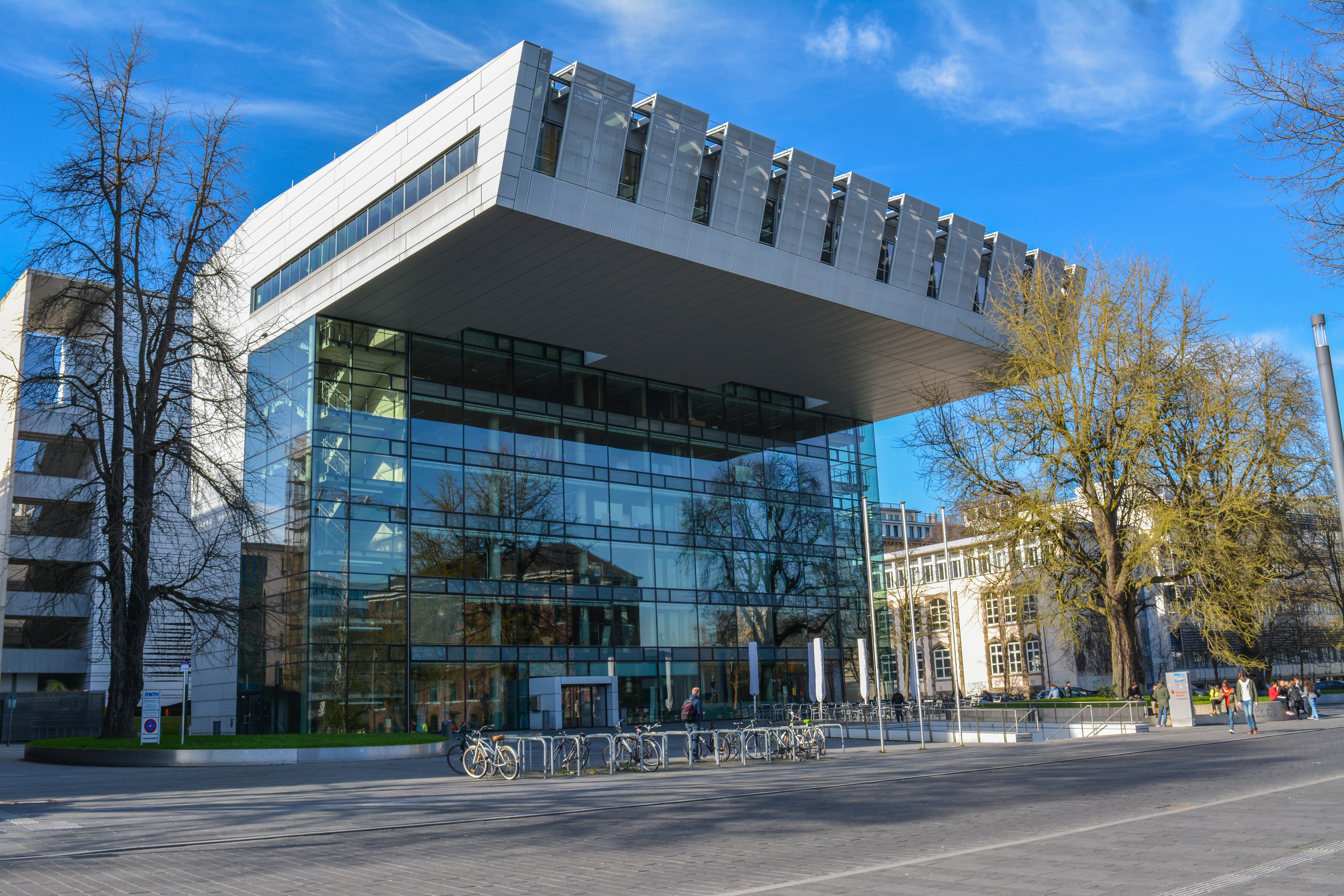
Similarly shaped building named SuperC at RWTH Aachen, Germany
