= UK pavilion at Expo 2010 =

Structure in Shanghai

Coordinates: 31°11′10″N 121°28′21″E

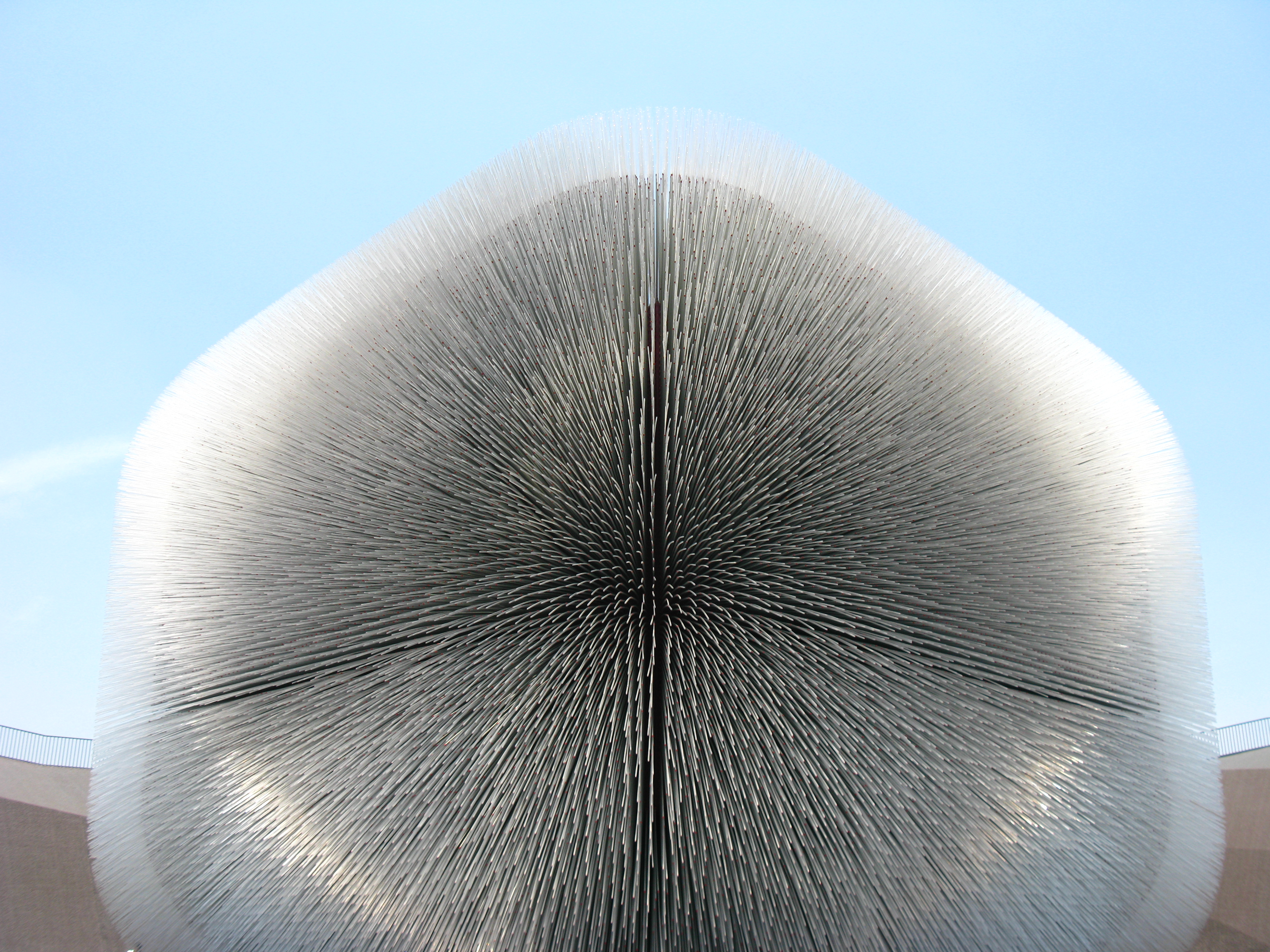
Seed Cathedral

The UK pavilion at Expo 2010, colloquially known as the Seed Cathedral, was a sculptural structure built for the 2010 World Expo in Shanghai by a nine-member conglomerate of British business and government resources directed by designer Thomas Heatherwick. Referencing the race to save plant seeds from round the world in banks, it housed 250,000 seeds at the ends of 60,000 acrylic fibre-optic filaments which projected both outside and inside the building.

== Design ==
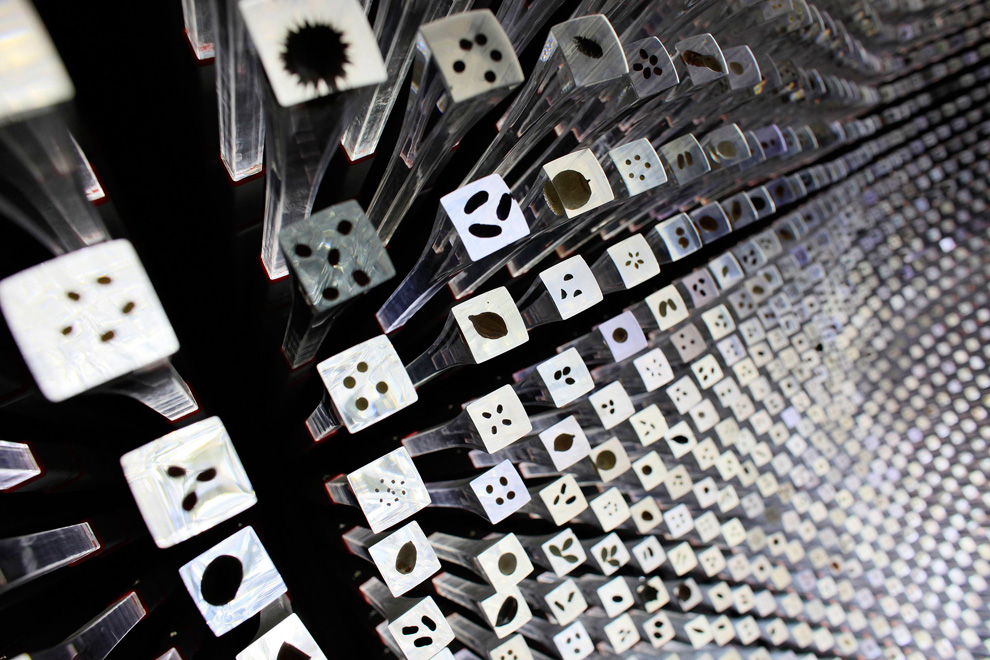
Seeds at the ends of rods in the interior of the building

The pavilion's architecture was an elaboration of Heatherwick's 2003 work Sitooterie II in Essex. Heatherwick conceived it as embodying what it exhibited and presenting a unique contrast with the norm of technology-focussed exposition pavilions. A rounded cuboid 20 metres (66 ft) high, it was placed in the centre of the 6,000 square metres (65,000 sq ft) United Kingdom exhibit site, so that visitors could choose whether to go inside or contemplate it from a distance. The grounds were landscaped with artificial turf; the pavilion entrance and exit and space for exhibits on the environment were located under the grounds and on an underground level of the pavilion.

The structure consisted of a steel and timber composite frame 1 metre thick with precision-drilled holes in which 60,000 fiber-optic filaments, 7.5 metres (25 ft) long and 20 millimetres (0.79 in) square in section, were held in aluminium sleeves. The filaments protruded both on the outside, where they rippled in the wind, and on the inside, where each displayed one or more seeds at its tip. The seeds were sourced from the Kunming Institute of Botany, a partner in Kew Gardens' Millennium Seed Bank Project, which the pavilion was designed to showcase. The interior was lighted during the day by light drawn in by the filaments; after dark, the building was illuminated from within by light sources in the filaments.

== History ==
Heatherwick won the contest held in 2007 by the Foreign & Commonwealth Office to design the pavilion, responding to the brief that it should be one of the five most popular attractions at the exposition. The original concept was a "Pavilion of Ideas", with programmable light sources at the ends of the spines, presenting concepts from presentations in the pavilion and from visitor suggestions. Heatherwick later developed this into an exploration of the relationship between cities and nature, in keeping with the Expo 2010 theme, "Better City, Better Life".

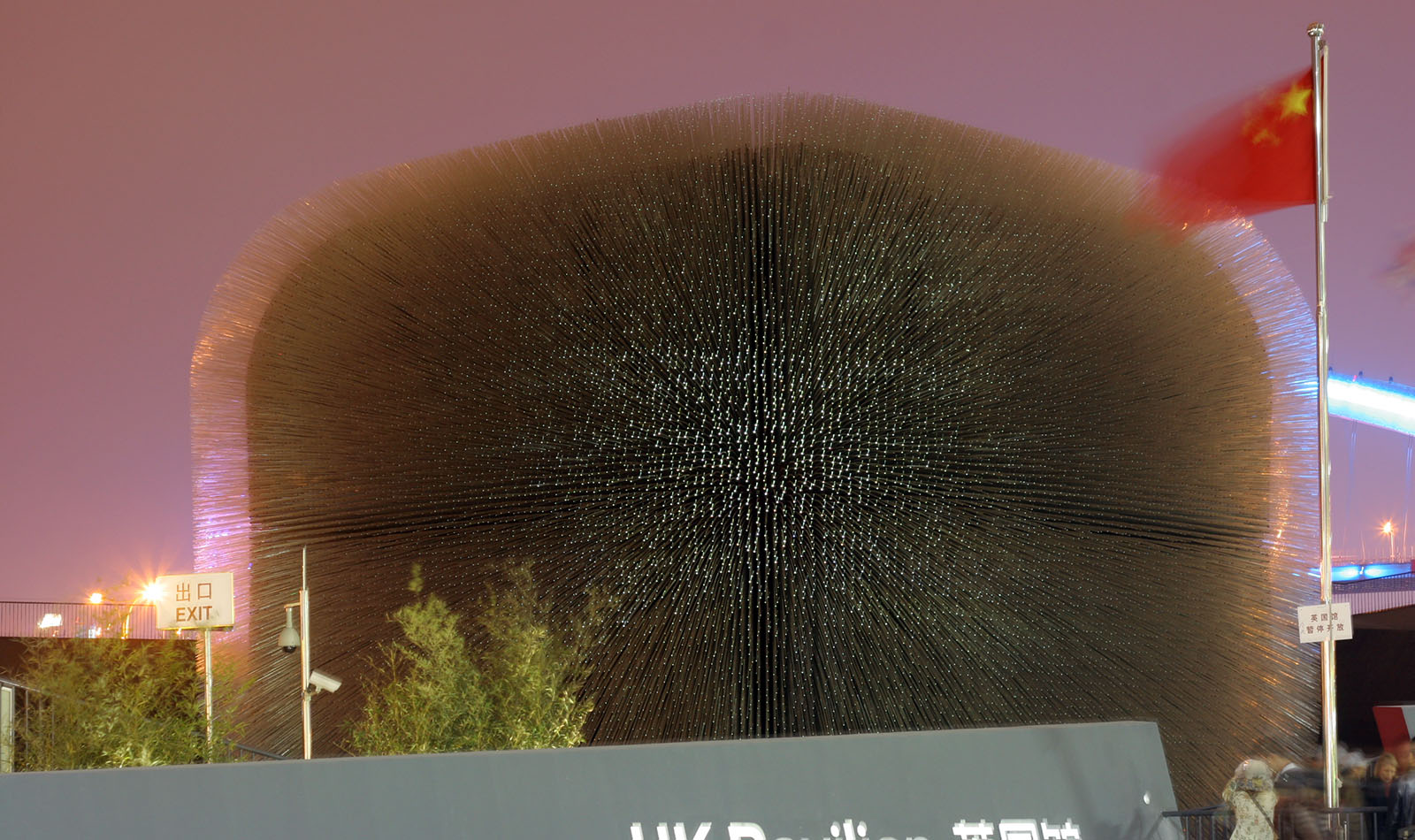
The pavilion at night

Constructed at a cost of £26 million, the UK pavilion was one of the most popular pavilions prior to the opening, and was given the Chinese nickname "the dandelion", a symbol of good luck. As of July 2010, it was attracting 50,000 people a day. It won the gold award of the Bureau International des Expositions for best pavilion design in its size category and the RIBA Lubetkin Prize for the best building outside the European Union.

After the exposition, the pavilion was dismantled as planned despite offers to buy it and reassemble it elsewhere. The seed-containing rods were originally to have been donated to schools. Some were donated to botanical institutions in the United Kingdom and China, and others given to heads of state and other dignitaries who had visited the pavilion. Most, including 10 signed by Prime Minister David Cameron, were auctioned on Taobao beginning in October 2010; 2.63 million yuan from the auction proceeds was donated to Shanghai Cerecare, a charity supporting children with brain paralysis. In January 2011, Taobao gave the auction its top award.
