= Stanton Williams =

British architectural firm

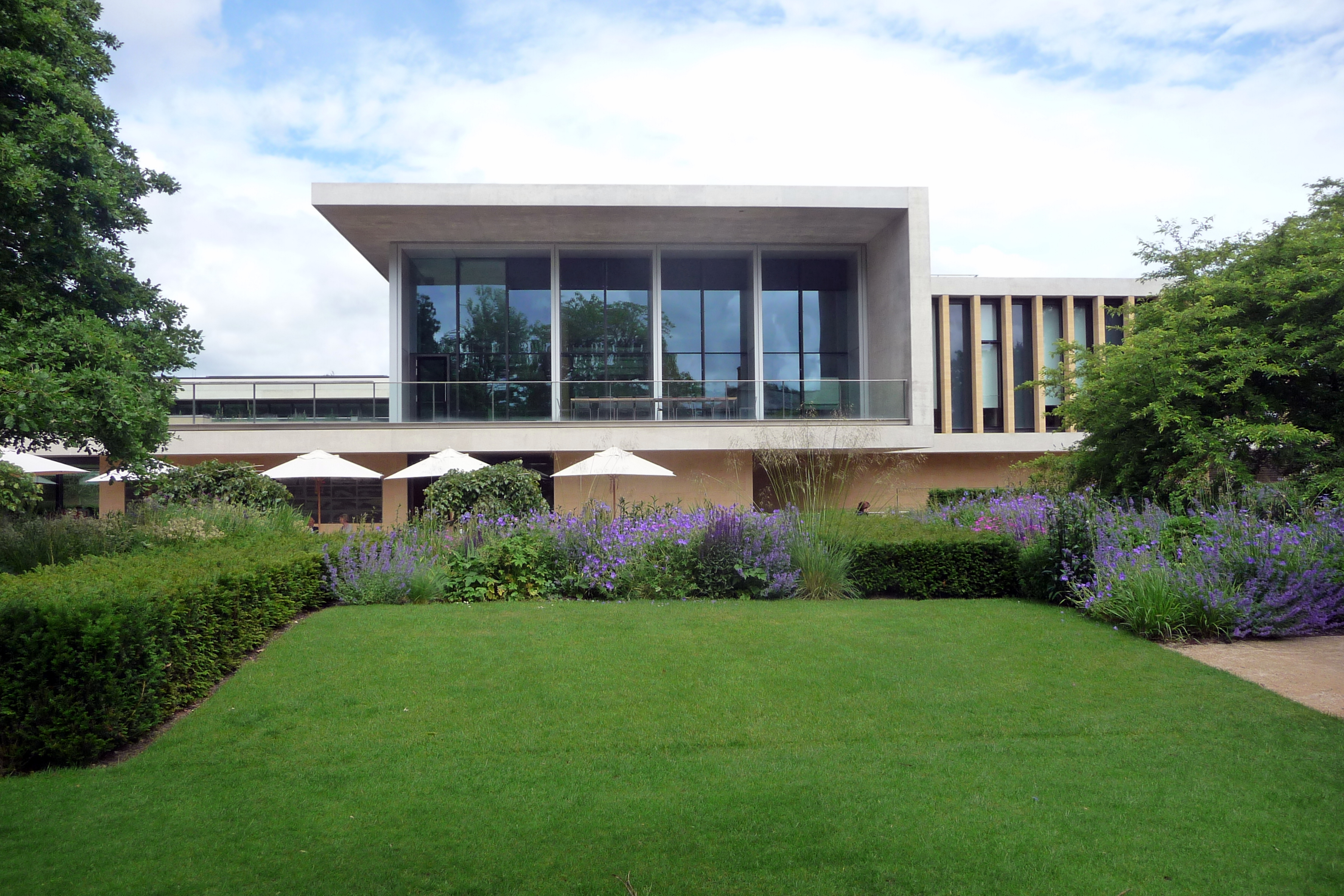
- Sainsbury Laboratory, Cambridge, in 2013

Practice information
- Founded: 1985; 41 years ago
- Location: London

Significant works and honors
- Buildings: Sainsbury Laboratory, Cambridge
- Awards: 2012 Stirling Prize

Website
- stantonwilliams.com/en

Stanton Williams is a British architectural firm based in Islington, London.

The firm's projects include the refurbishment of Rhodes House in Oxford, the Marshgate Building at University College, London and the North West Cambridge development (2019).

The firm was involved in the redevelopment of the Grade II listed Granary Building at King's Cross, as part an overall scheme to redevelop the area in the early 21st century.

In 2012 their Sainsbury Laboratory in Cambridge was awarded the RIBA Stirling Prize.
