= Phaeno Science Center =

Science museum in Wolfsburg, Germany

Phæno Science Center
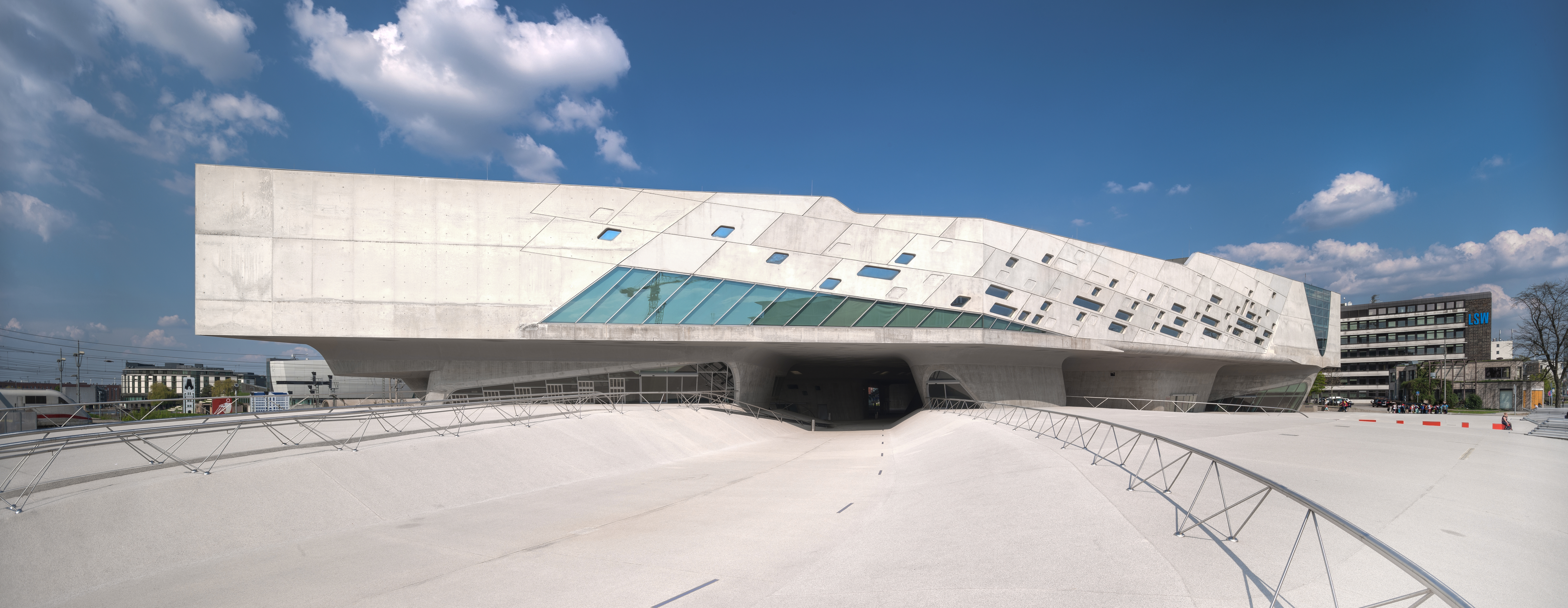
- Exterior view of the Phæno Science Center
- Interactive map of the Phæno Science Center area

General information
- Architectural style: Deconstructivism
- Location: Wolfsburg, Germany
- Coordinates: 52°25′44″N 10°47′24″E
- Completed: 24 November 2005
- Cost: 79,000,000€
- Client: City of Wolfsburg

Design and construction
- Architect: Zaha Hadid

The Phæno Science Center is an interactive science center in Wolfsburg, Germany, completed in 2005.

== The Phæno Science Center ==
The building was designed by the Iraqi-British architect Zaha Hadid, cost 67 million euros[1] and was realised in a project partnership with the Lörrach-based architectural firm Mayer Bährle. After just over four years of construction, the permanent exhibition was opened on 24 November 2005. Over 350 interactive experiment stations (around 40 of which were designed by artists) allow visitors to experience science and technology with different senses. The approximately 9000 square metre exhibition is divided into the main themes of ‘Life, Vision, Energy, Dynamics, Sense, Maths’. Changing special exhibitions complement the themes. In addition to the large exhibition, phaeno also offers workshops and training courses for schoolchildren, educators and teachers. The pupils solve puzzles, carry out experiments or work on constructive tasks and are accompanied by two members of staff[2][3].

In addition to science talks, science slams and lectures[4], the phaeno Science Theatre also offers a variety of shows. These are demonstrations with live experiments that represent a specific topic, e.g. the laser, air, mechanics, water or even fire show[5].

In line with the educational concept, according to which a playful approach to phenomena best promotes understanding, there is no prescribed course. Simple experimental arrangements encourage visitors to understand the respective functions by thinking about them and not just by trying them out. Display and text panels (German and English) at each station explain the respective process. The entrance area, the ideas forum and the science theatre are located on the ground floor, above which is the main floor with the picnic area[6] and the ‘experimental landscape’. Another important area is the children's area, which consists of three levels and is suitable for children from around three years of age. While exhibits suitable for children invite them to explore and try things out on the upper two levels, the lowest level is a quiet area where children can give free rein to their creativity with everyday objects such as corks and clothes pegs[7].

In 2022, phaeno had around 228,000 visitors of all ages;[8] around 35% of visitors are groups and individuals, 38% families and 27% schools and nurseries.

The visitors themselves come from all parts of Germany, but overall around 90% of visitors come from within a radius of 150 kilometres from phaeno.[9] It is a recognised extracurricular place of learning.

Architecture The massive but very dynamically designed building was essentially made of concrete and steel. Despite its 27,000 cubic metres of concrete, the building gives the impression of flowing and floating both inside and out. The building is 16 metres high and extends over a length of 170 metres. Ten conical concrete pillars (‘cones’) with a diameter of up to seven metres support the building. The pillars create a cave-like space for outdoor events. The cones are not solid but hollow and offer various functions, such as a science theatre or a forum for ideas. Inside the building, the perspectives change with every step through sloping walls, a kinked and uncovered steel girder roof structure, cursive viewing slits in solid exposed concrete walls and sloping niches. According to the architect Zaha Hadid, the building's all-round dynamism is intended to promote mental openness and mobility.

Preliminary planning began in November 1998, and one year later Joe Ansel, an American consultant and designer, was approached to handle the exhibitions and other operational aspects of the project. An architectural design competition was held in January 2000 and the prominent architect Zaha Hadid won, in conjunction with structural engineers, Adams Kara Taylor. About five years later, Phæno opened to the public on November 24, 2005 with over 250 interactive exhibits from Ansel Associates, Inc. all enclosed in an astounding concrete structure designed by Zaha Hadid, her German associate, Mayer Bährle architects and Adams Kara Taylor. The architectural design has been described as a "hypnotic work of architecture - the kind of building that utterly transforms our vision of the future." The design won a 2006 RIBA European Award as well as the 2006 Institution of Structural Engineers Award for Arts, Leisure and Entertainment Structures.

The building stands on concrete stilts, allowing visitors to the Autostadt to pass through without interfering with the workings of the building. Phæno is connected to the Autostadt by a metal bridge accessed by escalators and stairs either side. The underside of Phæno and the "stilts" are illuminated.

Dr. Guthardt is now Phæno's first Executive Director. Phæno has enjoyed high attendance and broad public acceptance since its grand opening. The Science Center has a theme song, "Phaenomenal," which was written and performed by American singer/songwriter Amanda Somerville for the opening.

The Phæno was included on a list of the 7 wonders of the Modern World (objects built since 2000) by The Financialist.

== Film appearances ==
The Phaeno appears in the 2009 film The International as the headquarters of an Italian weapons company, digitally inserted at the base of a cliff on Lake Iseo.

The Phaeno also appears in the 2013 German disaster film Heroes as a Large Hadron Collider.

The Phaeno appears in the Belgian-Dutch dystopian television series Arcadia (2023).

== See also ==
- List of science centers
