= Manchester School of Architecture =

Architecture school of Manchester Metropolitan University and University of Manchester

Coordinates: 53.469018°N 2.23811°W

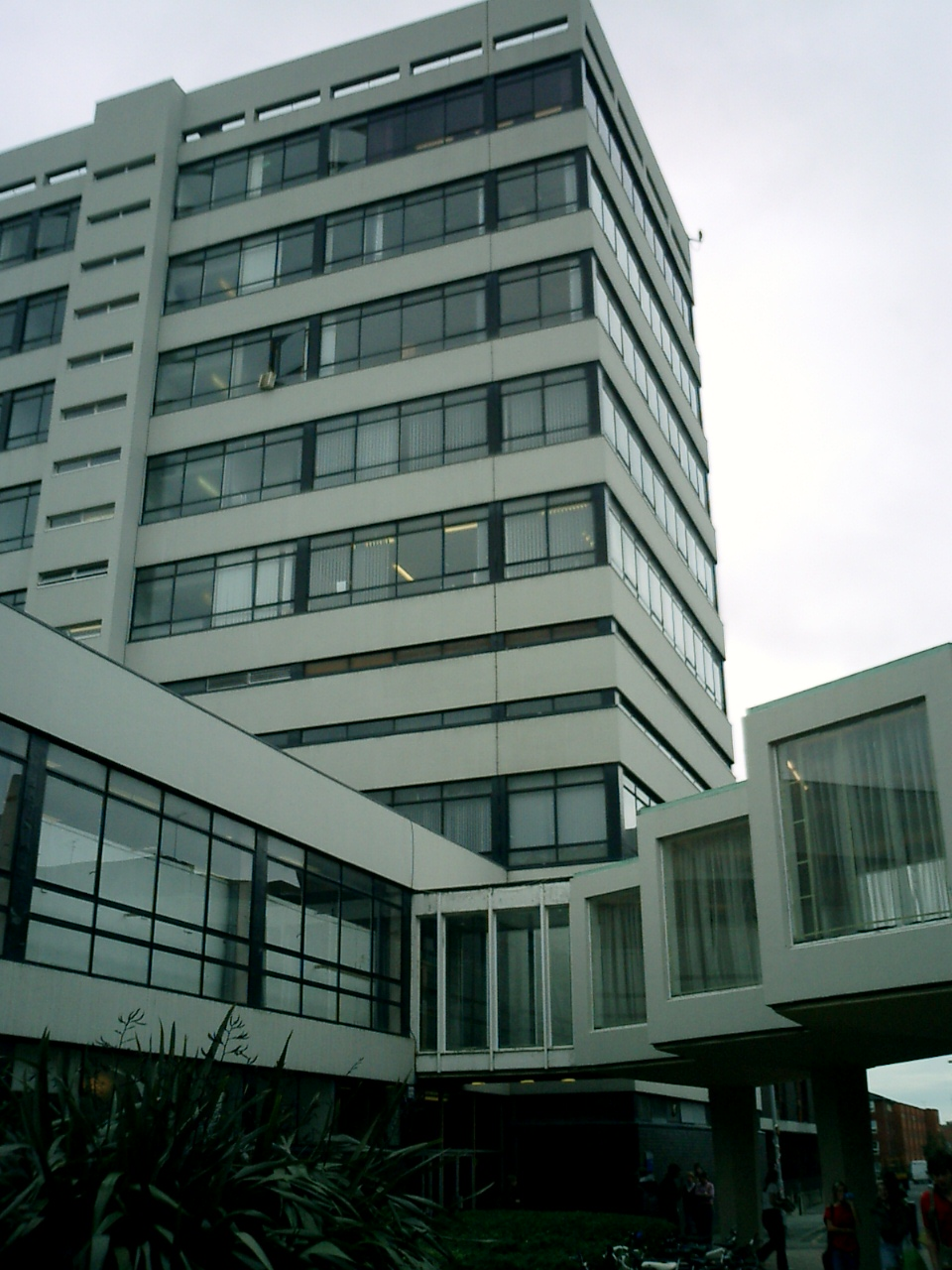
- The Chatham Studio Building
- Type: Architecture
- Established: 1 September 1996
- Head: Prof. Kevin Singh
- Faculty: University of Manchester (University of Manchester School of Environment and Development); Manchester Metropolitan University (Manchester School of Art)
- Location: Kantorowich Building (University of Manchester); Chatham Tower (Manchester Metropolitan), Manchester, England, United Kingdom

The Manchester School of Architecture (MSA) is a School of Architecture, jointly administered by the University of Manchester and the Manchester Metropolitan University in the city of Manchester, England.

The School was formed in 1996 with the merger of the architecture departments of the University of Manchester (then Victoria University of Manchester) and Manchester Metropolitan University. Students of MSA are classified as students of both universities and are issued with separate cards for each university, allowing them to use the resources and facilities of both institutions. Upon graduating the degree is awarded by both universities.

The School covers three main aspects of architectural education. An undergraduate course (BA Hons) which has exemption to the RIBA Part One exam; a professional postgraduate course (MArch) offers exemption to the RIBA Part Two exams; and finally a range of postgraduate Masters and PhD courses.

== School ==
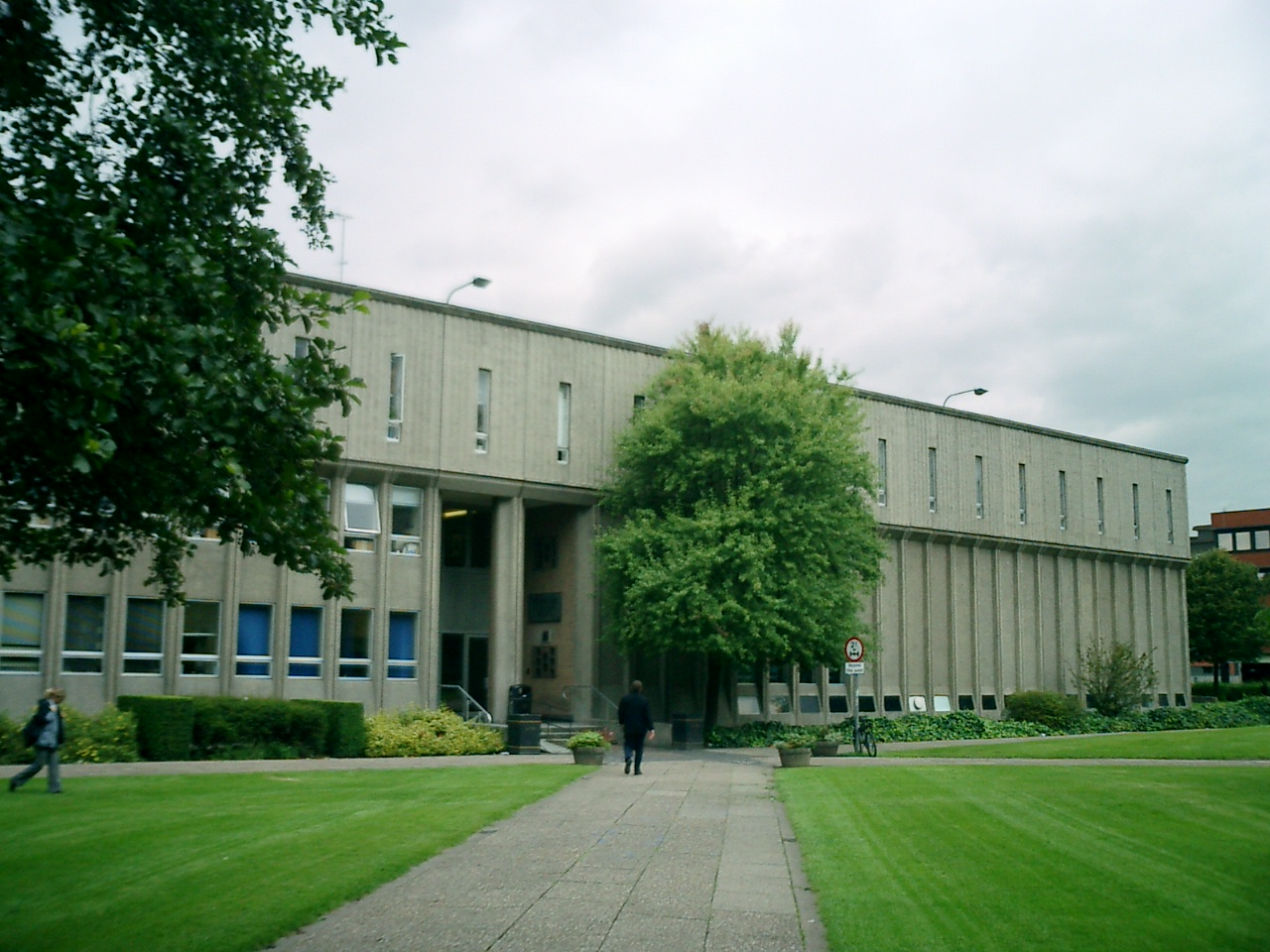
The Architecture and Planning Building, University of Manchester, Bridgeford Street, known as Kantorowich Building (Note: It has been named after Roy Herman Kantorowich, formerly Professor of Architecture in the university; Kantorowich and his colleague Hanson designed the building.)

Researchers from the Manchester Architectural Research Centre (MARC) input directly into the graduate teaching. MARC is a multidisciplinary research team based at the University of Manchester: its staff and postgraduates are researchers in a variety of affiliated fields of study, and offer an interdisciplinary context for architectural research at MSA.

Graduation ceremonies of Manchester School of Architecture are held in turn annually at the University of Manchester and at Manchester Metropolitan University. For example, graduates of 2013 attended the ceremony with fellow University of Manchester students in the Whitworth Hall, while the 2014 graduation was held by Manchester Metropolitan University in an external rented venue.

== Rankings ==
Since formation in 1996, of the 47 universities in the United Kingdom with RIBA accreditation, the school was often ranked in Top 10.

2017 MSA rankings (Architecture/Built Environment)
Ranking System	World	European	National
2017 QS World University	6	4	2
2017 Guardian	–	–	9
2017 Complete University Guide	–	–	15

== Kantorowich Building ==
The school occupies the Kantorowich Building (formerly known as the Architecture and Planning Building) which was opened in 1970. The architects were two professors of architecture, N. L. Hanson and R. H. Kantorowich. Though the exterior is plain there is an attractive courtyard inside with pools and formally displayed a Barbara Hepworth sculpture. Its neighbours are the Dental Hospital, the Business School and the Arthur Lewis Building. The B.15 Modelmaking Workshop was established within the basement of the building where it has served all architecture courses taught at the school since 1970.

== Notable staff and alumni ==
- Leslie Martin KBE
  - Royal Festival Hall (Grade I)
- Norman Foster, Baron Foster of Thames Bank (Pritzker Prize: 1999, Stirling Prize: 1998, 2004)
  - Willis Building (Grade I), Reichstag dome, Millennium Bridge, The Gherkin, Millau Viaduct, HSBC Hong Kong headquarters building)
- Stephen Hodder (Stirling Prize 1996)
  - 17 New Wakefield Street, Centenary Building
- Dalibor Vesely (RIBA Annie Spink Award for Excellence in Architectural Education 2006)
- Michael Starling (current Chairman of Architects Registration Board)
- Roland Paoletti
  - Jubilee Line Extension, London Underground
- Desmond Williams OBE
  - St Mary's Church, Dunstable (Grade II listed)
- Basil Ward (head of school)
