= Corporation Street =

Corporation Street may refer to:

- Corporation Street, Birmingham

- Corporation Street tram stop

- Corporation Street, Dublin
- Corporation Street, Manchester
- Corporation Street Bridge, Manchester
- Sheffield Inner Ring Road
