= List of Liverpool John Moores University halls of residence =

This is a list of the halls of residence, described as partner halls by Liverpool John Moores University (LJMU), available to students of LJMU for 2021/22 and 2022/23 academic years.

The halls listed below are accredited with the University and have the support of the LJMU Student Living team.

Other providers or private landlords are also available to LJMU students, however the providers and landlords not listed below do not have any affiliation with LJMU, they do not benefit from the support of the LJMU Student Living team and therefore are not advised or promoted by the University.

Any accommodation can be used for students of any LJMU campus, selection is up to student preference, (i.e. distance to campus).

Students of other universities can still accommodate in these halls as they are privately owned and operated.

Most accommodation available can be walked by students of both City and Mount Pleasant Campuses.

LJMU Partner Halls
Name of Residence	Accommodation Provider	Nearest LJMU Campus and Library	Site Capacity	Link to LJMU Accommodation Page
Agnes Jones House	Gather Students	Mount Pleasant & Aldham Robarts	275	LJMU Agnes Jones House
Albert Court	Campus Student Villages	Mount Pleasant & Aldham Robarts	516	LJMU Albert Court
Atlantic Point	Unite Students	City & Avril Robarts	928	LJMU Atlantic Point
Byrom Point	Student Roost	City & Avril Robarts	398	LJMU Byrom Point
Capital Gate	Student Roost	Mount Pleasant & Aldham Robarts	430	LJMU Capital Gate
Copperas House	Urban Sleep	Mount Pleasant & Aldham Robarts	294	LJMU Copperas House
Glassworks	Abodus Student Living	City & Avril Robarts	323	LJMU Glassworks
Grand Central	Unite Students	Mount Pleasant & Aldham Robarts	1236	LJMU Grand Central
Grenville Street	Sanctuary Students	Mount Pleasant & Aldham Robarts	216	LJMU Grenville Street
Hardman House	Urban Sleep	Mount Pleasant & Aldham Robarts	355	LJMU Hardman House
Horizon Heights	Unite Students	Mount Pleasant & Aldham Robarts	1085	LJMU Horizon Heights
Marybone Student Village: Marybone (SV) 1 Marybone (SV) 2 Marybone (SV) 3	Sanctuary Students	City & Avril Robarts	817	LJMU Marybone 1 LJMU Marybone 2 LJMU Marybone 3
Moorfield	Unite Students	City & Avril Robarts	416	LJMU Moorfield
St Andrew's Gardens	Homes for Students	Mount Pleasant & Aldham Robarts	475	LJMU St Andrew's Gardens
St Luke's View	Unite Students	Mount Pleasant & Aldham Robarts	776	LJMU St Luke's View
The Arch	Downing Students	Mount Pleasant & Aldham Robarts		LJMU The Arch

Former landmark

Name of Residence	Previous Landlord	Previous Provider	New Landlord	Time Operating	New Purpose
North Western Hall	Liverpool John Moores University	Sanctuary Students	Marcus Worthington Group	1996 - 2018	2020- Radisson RED Liverpool Hotel
