= Grand Central, Liverpool =

Grand Central could refer to two different buildings in Liverpool, England:

- Grand Central Hall, a former Methodist church
- Unite Grand Central, student halls of residence
