= Artisan Heights =

Student residential tower in Manchester, England

Coordinates: 53.473°N 2.241°W

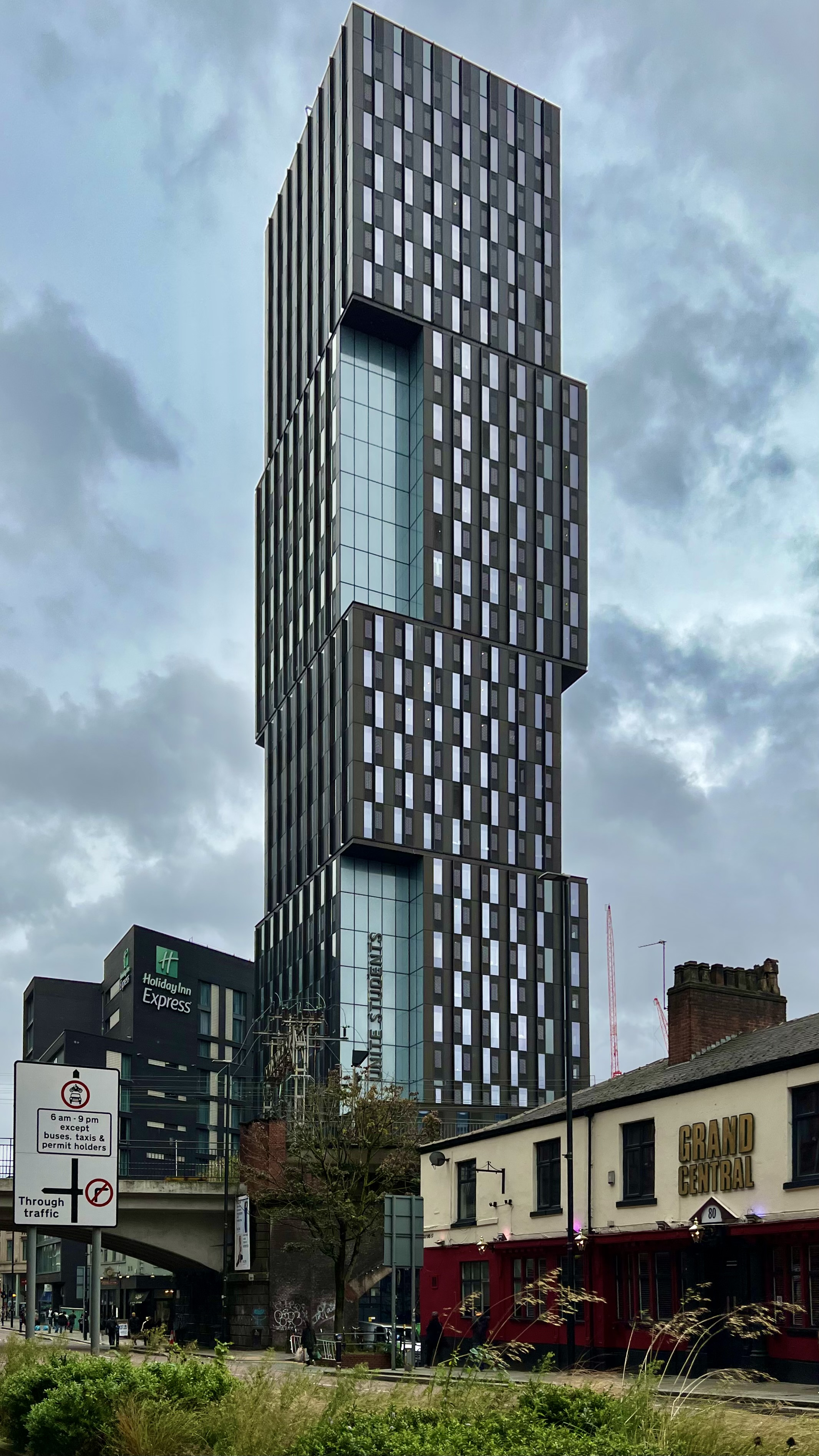

General information
- Status: Completed
- Type: Residential
- Location: Manchester, Greater Manchester, England, 3 New Wakefield Street, Manchester, M1 5AA
- Construction started: 2018
- Completed: 2020
- Cost: £50 million
- Owner: Unite Students

Height
- Roof: 95 m (312 ft)

Technical details
- Floor count: 32
- Floor area: 17,206 m^{2} (185,200 sq ft)

Design and construction
- Architect: SimpsonHaugh & Partners
- Main contractor: Bowmer + Kirkland

Website
- Official website

Artisan Heights, also known as 1–5 Wakefield Street, is a student accommodation high-rise tower in Manchester, England. The 95-metre (312 ft) tall building was designed by SimpsonHaugh & Partners and contains 603 student bedrooms.

The tower sits close to Oxford Road station and the Bridgewater Heights building, another high-rise student accommodation block.

== History ==
=== Planning ===
Planning permission for the original proposal of a 92 m (302 ft) tall, 30-storey tower with 573-bedrooms was submitted to Manchester City Council in July 2017 and granted in December 2017. A new planning application was submitted in April 2018 to add another two storeys and increasing the number of student beds from 573 to 603. The proposal for the cladding was also changed from grey metallic to anodised bronze aluminium panels.

=== Construction ===
Work began on site in January 2018 for the demolition phase of the project, with contractor Bowmer + Kirkland clearing an existing warehouse and the music venue and nightclub Sound Control. Construction of the building started in 2018 and was completed in 2020.

== Facilities ==
The bedrooms are arranged in a mixture of studio and 5–10 bed cluster apartments with shared kitchen facilities. Students also have access to games, TV, study, lounge and meeting rooms, a post room, laundry and cycle storage.

== Gallery ==
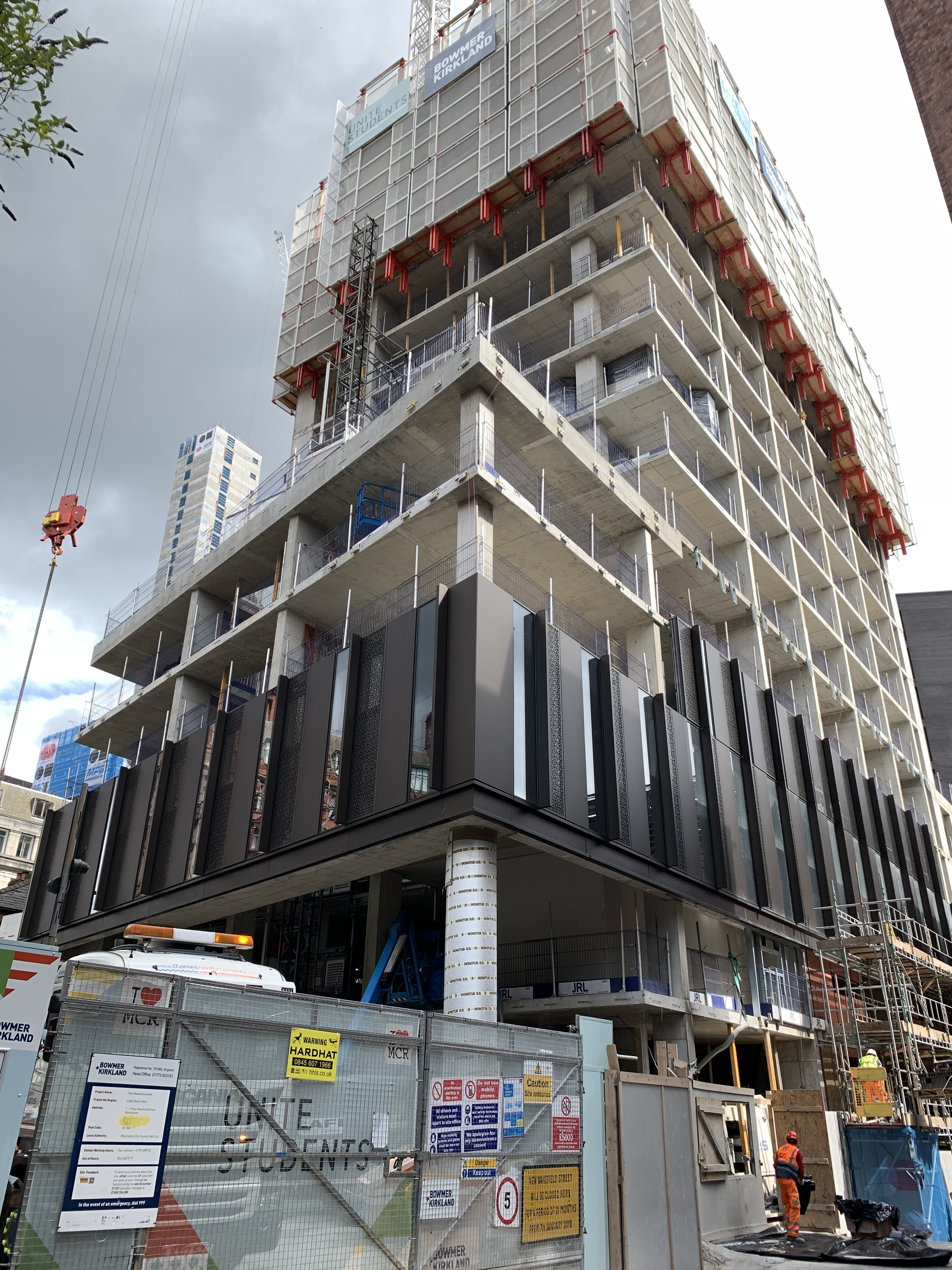
Artisan Heights under construction in August 2019

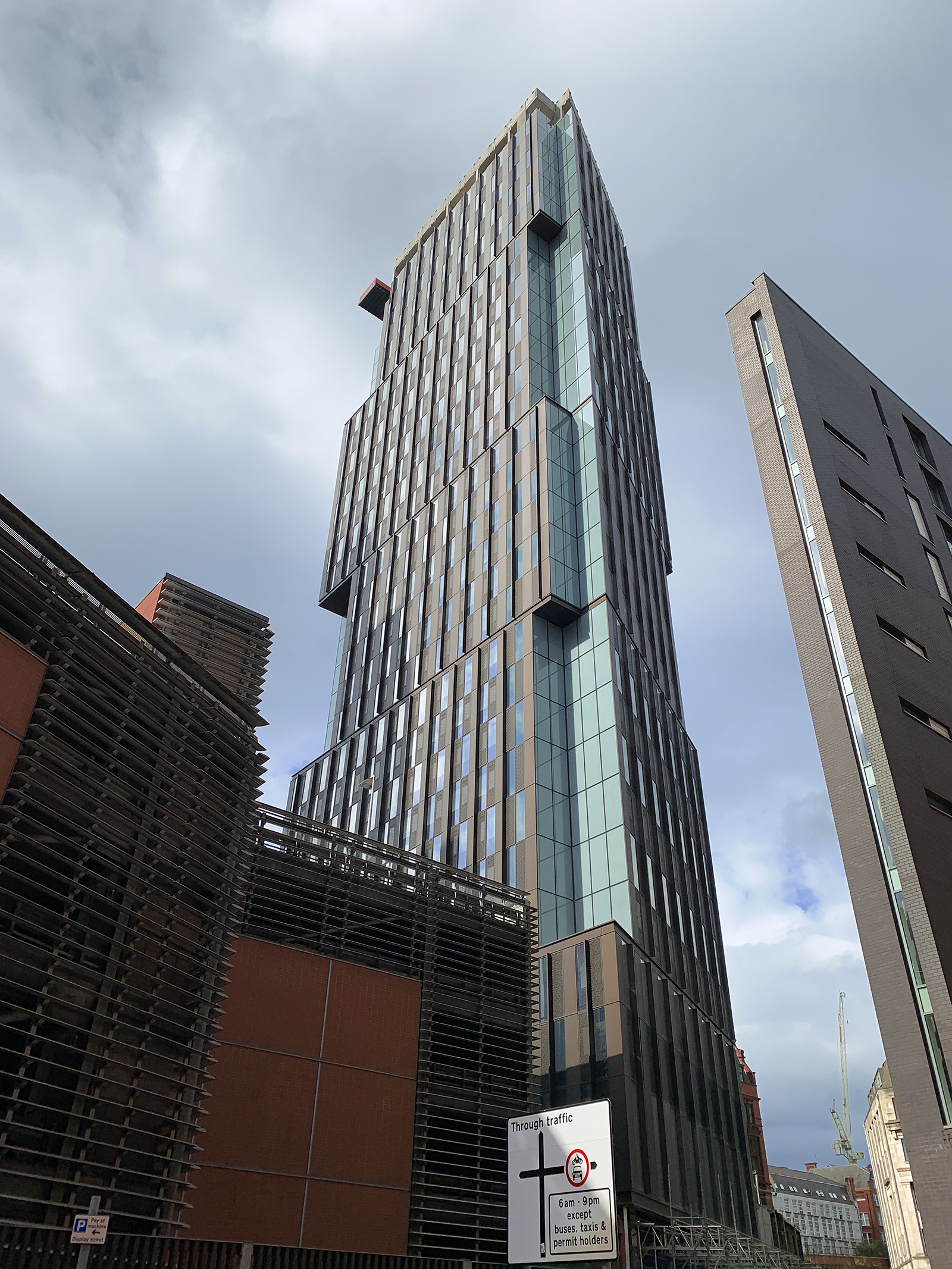
The tower in June 2020

== See also ==
- List of tallest buildings and structures in Greater Manchester
