= Polk Stanley Wilcox Architects =

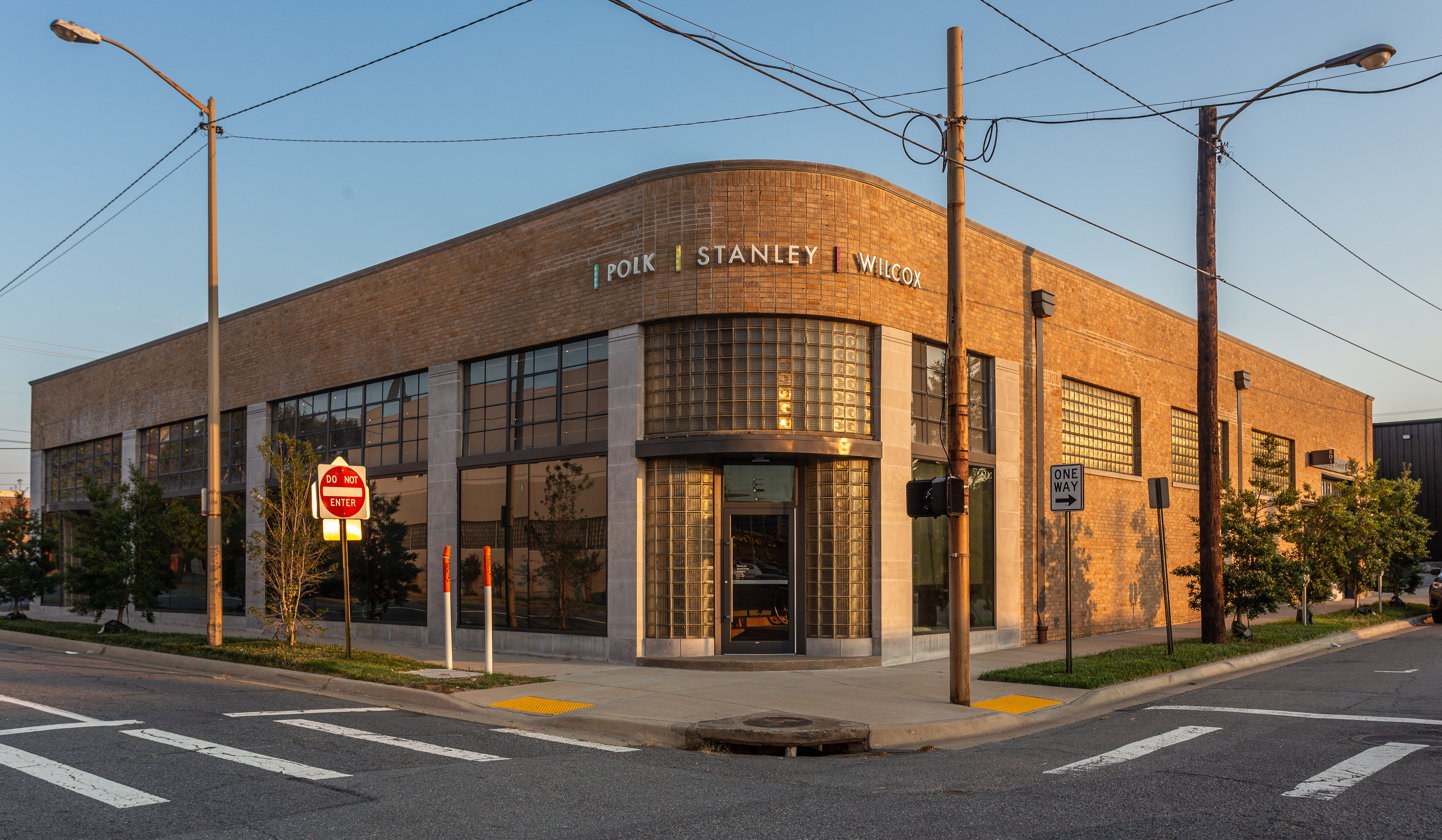
Office at 323 West 8th Street (corner of Spring Street) in Little Rock, Arkansas

Polk Stanley Wilcox Architects is an architectural firm based in Little Rock, Arkansas and Fayetteville, Arkansas. It has presence in public, corporate, and residential settings, and does interior design in addition to architecture. It has done multiple projects for the University of Arkansas and has designed headquarters for firms such as Heifer International. In a joint venture it contributed to the design of the William J. Clinton Foundation Presidential Center & Park.

In 2009, Joe Stanley, a principal, was CEO and was nominated for Arkansas Business Executive of the Year.

The firm and its architects have won more than 100 awards, including:

- American Institute of Architects' National Institute Honor Award for the Heifer International Headquarters in Little Rock, in 2008, which the firm itself regards as its highest award.
- American Society for Healthcare Engineering VISTA Award "recognizing our team-oriented 'collaborative' design process for the UAMS College of Public Health"
- National Library Building Award from the American Library Association for the Arkansas Studies Institute

The firm has performed a number of building renovation designs for historic buildings which protected or enhanced historic aspects, including for some properties listed on the National Register of Historic Places (NRHP). These include:

- Robinson Center renovation and expansion, NRHP-listed in 2007
- the Ross Building, NRHP-listed in 2019, which it occupied from the 1980s until 2009
- the Winchester Building, NRHP-listed in 2019, under renovation by the firm in 2019, to which the firm expected to move in late 2019.
