= Unite Students =

British real estate company

The Unite Group Plc
- Type: Public
- Traded as: LSE: UTG; FTSE 250 component
- Industry: Student accommodation
- Founded: 1991
- Founder: Nicholas Porter
- Headquarters: Bristol, England, UK
- Key people: Richard Huntingford (Chair); Joe Lister (CEO); Michael Burt (CFO)
- Products: Student accommodation (halls of residence)
- Services: Property investment and development
- Revenue: ▲£332.8 million (2025)
- Operating income: ▲£175.5 million (2025)
- Net income: ▼£97.6 million (2025)
- Number of employees: 2,000 (2025)
- Website: www.unitegroup.com

The Unite Group Plc (trading as Unite Students) is a British developer, owner and operator of purpose built student accommodation (PBSA). The company is listed on the London Stock Exchange and is a constituent of the FTSE 250 Index.

== History ==
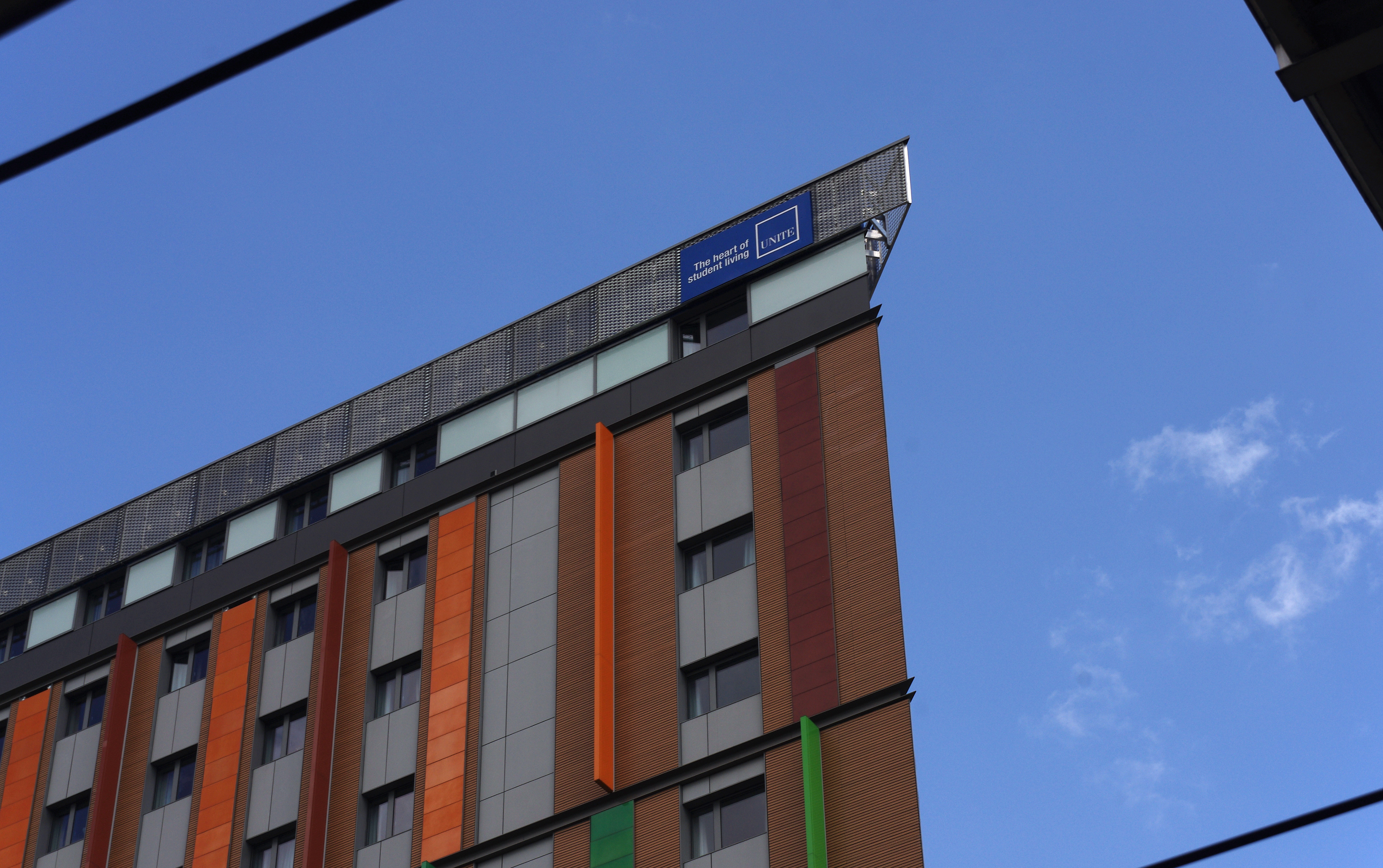
A Unite Students facility near Tottenham Hale station

The Unite Group was founded by Nicholas Porter in Bristol, England, in 1991. Aged 21 and following research with the University of the West of England, he recognised a growing demand for student accommodation. After a period of expansion within Bristol, in 1998 Unite opened its first properties in London. It listed on the Alternative Investment Market the following year.

In 2000 the business moved its share register to the London Stock Exchange, and opened properties in Manchester, Liverpool and Portsmouth. During the following decade, Unite created investment vehicles to secure growth in London, across England and into Scotland. Of these vehicles, The Unite UK Student Accommodation Fund (USAF) is Europe's largest fund focusing solely on direct-let student accommodation. In 2006, Porter announced he was stepping down as chief executive. He was succeeded at the end of the year by chief financial officer Mark Allan.

By 2011 the business had grown to 40,000 beds. It remains the UK's largest provider of student accommodation by capacity, but second to IQ Student Accommodation by value of its portfolio of property.

In 2012 it founded charitable trust The Unite Foundation, which provides free accommodation and a cost-of-living allowance to students from "challenging circumstances". In April 2014 Unite renamed itself "Unite Students". Simultaneously, it launched its "Home for Success" corporate philosophy; which it describes as its "business purpose". The Home for Success announcement included a £40m reinvestment of profits into the business and 16 "signature commitments", all of which relate to an improved student experience.

Unite Group converted to a real estate investment trust with effect from 1 January 2017.

In November 2019, the Competition and Markets Authority approved the proposed acquisition by the company of its competitor, Liberty Living, for £1.4 billion. The transaction was completed in December 2019.

In August 2025, it was announced that Unite Group would buy Empiric Student Property in a deal worth £634 million, covering 68 buildings in 22 cities with accommodation for 7,700 students.

In February 2026, following a drop in international students coming to the UK, Unite Group lowered its profit outlook and announced it would reduce future student housing builds. It also announced the sale of a 571-bed St Pancras Way property in London to Unite UK Student Accommodation Fund (a joint venture between Unite and Singapore's sovereign wealth fund). It also stated that it would be concentrating on accommodation in cities with high-tariff universities. A property revaluation in the first six months of 2026 resulted in a £417 million pre-tax loss for that half year. Unite Group had 72,000 beds under its management, but announced an intention to reduce this to between 55,000 and 60,000 to create a "more focused, higher-quality portfolio" which will see Unite Group cease to have a presence in nine non-core cities.

== Operations ==
As of 2024, the company provides residential accommodation to around 68,000 students across 152 buildings across the UK, and is the largest and oldest PBSA provider in the country.

In addition to owning a portfolio of its own properties, Unite operates properties on behalf of two investment funds that it part owns:

- UK Student Accommodation Fund (USAF), which has a portfolio of 61 properties, owned by a consortium of investors (29% Unite).
- London Student Accommodation (LSAV), which has a portfolio of 14 properties, owned 50:50 by Unite and GIC (Singapore's sovereign wealth fund).

== Notable properties ==
Properties
Image	Property	Location	Beds	Portfolio	Acquired or completed	Divested	Notes
	Artisan Heights	Manchester	603		2020		Purpose built by Unite.
	Broadcasting Tower	Leeds	241	USAF	2015		Developed by Downing in 2009, acquired by USAF in 2015.
	Bridgewater Heights	Manchester	525		2020		Part of the acquisition of Liberty Living.
	Dorset House	Oxford	313		2024		Purpose built by Unite.
	Grand Central	Liverpool	1,210		2003		Purpose built by Unite.
	Marketgate	Bristol	505		2001		Converted from a 1970 office building by Unite for £4M.
	Newgate Court	Newcastle upon Tyne	575		2018		Purpose built by Unite for £32M.
	Rushford Court	Durham	363		2018		Mix of purpose built and renovation by Unite. Used as Durham University college accommodation from 2024 under a forty-year agreement.
	Sky Plaza	Leeds	533		2009		Purpose built by Unite.
	Tŷ Pont Haearn	Cardiff	642		2020		Part of the acquisition of Liberty Living.
