= Newgate Court =

Student residential tower in Newcastle-upon-Tyne, England

Coordinates: 54.9713°N 1.6161°W

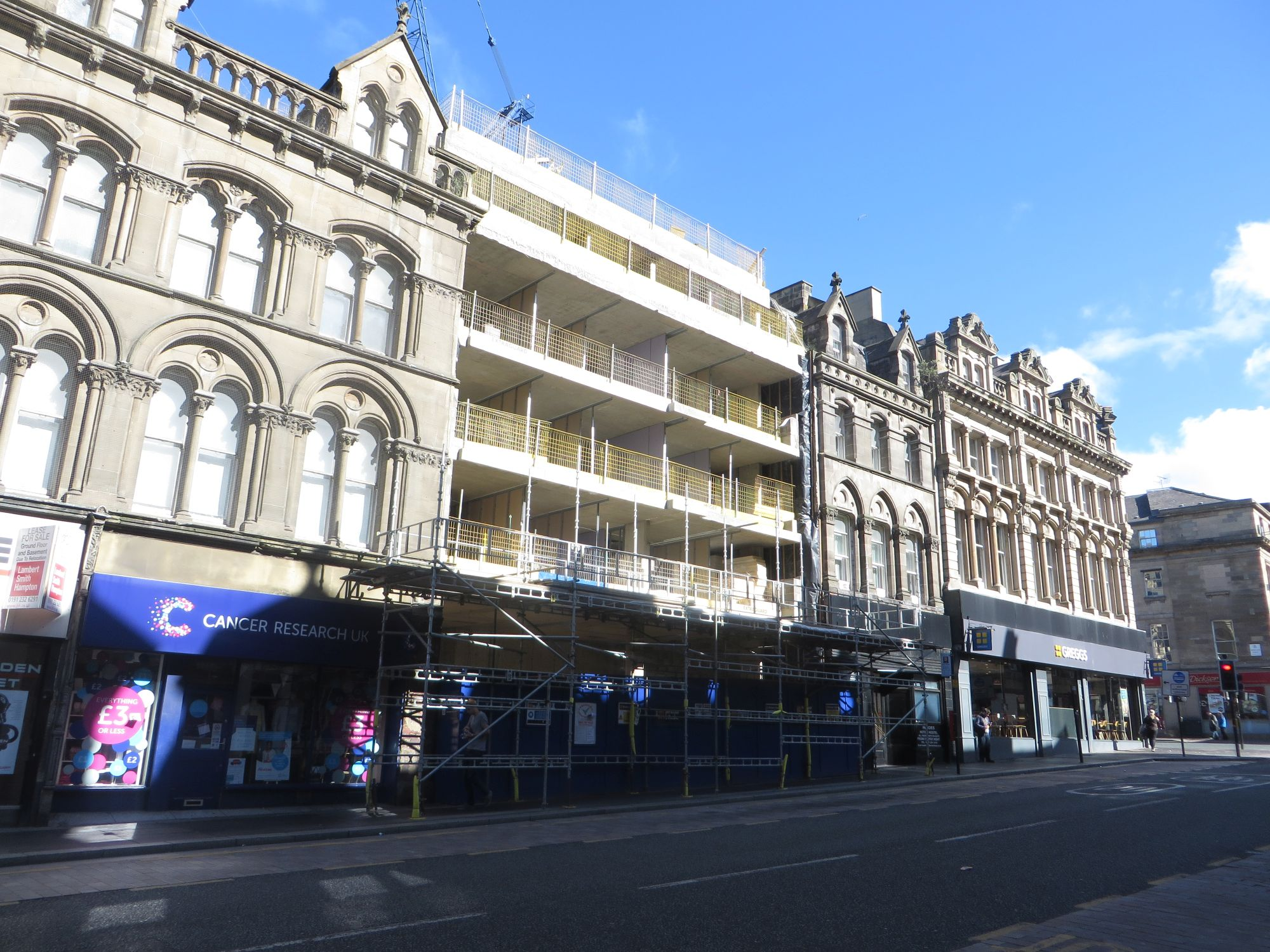
- Newgate Court under construction in 2017

General information
- Status: Completed
- Type: Residential
- Location: Grainger Town, Newcastle-upon-Tyne, Grainger Street, Newcastle-upon-Tyne NE1 5AT
- Construction started: 2016
- Completed: 2018
- Cost: £32 million
- Owner: Unite Students

Technical details
- Floor count: 9
- Floor area: 185,000 sq ft

Design and construction
- Architect: Urban Innovations
- Main contractor: Mcaleer & Rushe

Other information
- Number of rooms: 575

Website
- Official website

Newgate Court is a student accommodation building in Newcastle upon Tyne, England. The 185,000 sq.ft building was designed by Urban Innovations and contains 575 student bedrooms. The building sits on the site of the former Newgate Shopping Centre which opened in the 1969. Outlets of Subway and German Doner Kebab are located on the lower floor facing Newgate Street. A 265-bedroom hotel and business centre owned by Dalata is also part of the development and houses an indoor crazy golf course.

== History ==
=== Medieval Times ===
Built in 1399, Newgate was Newcastle's medieval prison, built over the a new reinforced gate in the North-west of the town walls. Up to 60 prisoners who had been sentenced to death were housed in the gaol's 10 small rooms before they were taken to the Town Moor to be executed. Tempted by the prison's proximity to the town's outer limits, in 1800 three prisoners escaped Newgate by making a hole in the chimney of their cell and creating a rope from bedding. A fourth prisoner also attempted to escape but became stuck within the chimney and was found by the wardens.

By the 1820s Newgate was described by Newspapers as “inconvenient, insufficient and insecure” and following an act of Parliament in 1822, a new prison centred around Prisoner rehabilitation was commissioned to be designed by John Dobson, one of the main architect behind Grainger Town. The decision to build the new gaol led to the demise of Newgate. Despite its utility as a gaol having long since passed, its demolition was met with outrage by some people, most notably the Antiquarians in Newcastle who wrote the ballad "Newgate Street Petition to Mr Mayor” in protest.

=== Newgate Shopping Centre ===
In 1969, as Newcastle underwent major redevelopment a new shopping centre on the site. Noted for its grey-slab appearance that matched much of the urban architecture of the '60s and '70s. Above the shopping centre was the seven-storey, 85-bedroom Swallow Hotel which the Evening Chronicle described as "the first luxury hotel to be built in the centre of Newcastle for more than 70 years."

Over its forty years the 20 unit shopping centre housed several large brands including; Woolworths, Bata Shoes, HMV, The Northern Gas Board and Halfords. One other popular store in the centre was a men's boutique called For The Exclusive Man. Opened by Newcastle United superstar Malcolm Macdonald in 1972.

=== Newgate Court ===
The Newgate Shopping Centre site was bought by McAleer & Rushe for £18.2m in 2006. However, there initial redevelopment bid was blocked by city planners for being “the most hideous design possible on one of England most elegant streets.” After changes to plans to enhance the public realm and extensive consulting with Historic England, Newcastle City Council approved McAleer & Rushe's £100m plans for a mixed-use scheme at Newgate Court in 2015. With plans to create 400 construction jobs building 269-bedrooms hotel, student housing and 2,000 sq m of commercial space for retail, leisure or professional services use. The outside of the building was finished with natural stone to further complement the rich heritage of the surrounding buildings of Grainger Town. It was calculated the scheme will generate £3.4m of new homes bonus payments for Newcastle City Council and £450,000 of additional Business Rates receipts per year.

Work began on site in March 2016. In September 2016 dust from the site formed a dangerous cloud in the area, and two months later nearby roads were forced to close after flying debris knocked the building's scaffolding out of place. Construction was completed in August 2018.

== Facilities ==
The bedrooms are arranged in a mixture of studio and 4-10 bed cluster apartments with shared kitchen facilities. Students also have access to games, two studies, lounge, cinema room, courtyards, parcel room, laundry and underground parking.
