= Empiric Student Property =

British student accommodation provider

Empiric Student Property plc
- Company type: Public
- Traded as: LSE: ESP
- Industry: Property investment
- Founded: 2014; 12 years ago
- Headquarters: London, United Kingdom
- Area served: England
- Key people: Mark Pain (Chairman); Duncan Garood (CEO)
- Revenue: ▲£84.2 million (2024)
- Operating income: ▼£54.4 million (2024)
- Net income: ▼£34.4 million (2024)
- Website: www.empiric.co.uk

Empiric Student Property plc is a British company providing student accommodation. It was listed on the London Stock Exchange and was a constituent of the FTSE 250 Index until it was acquired by Unite Group in January 2026.

== History ==
The company was established by Paul Hadaway and Tim Attlee as London Cornwall Student REIT plc in February 2014. It changed its name to Empiric Student Property plc in March 2014. The first CEO was Paul Hadaway, but after incurring significant extra costs involved with establishing its "Hello Student" management and letting platform, Hadaway stood down and the board instigated a major strategic review, with steps being taken to bring costs under control.

Subsequent management changes involved Attlee being appointed CEO in November 2018, and then Duncan Garrood taking over in June 2020. Later that year, the company resolved to keep costs under control by implementing a strategy of clustering its properties so that they are in "close proximity to top-tier universities". This necessitated significant disposals of properties which did not meet the new criteria in 2021.

In August 2025, it was announced that Unite Group would buy Empiric Student Property in a deal worth £634 million. The scheme of arrangement was approved by the court and became effective on 27 January 2026.
