= Stephen Hodder =

English architect

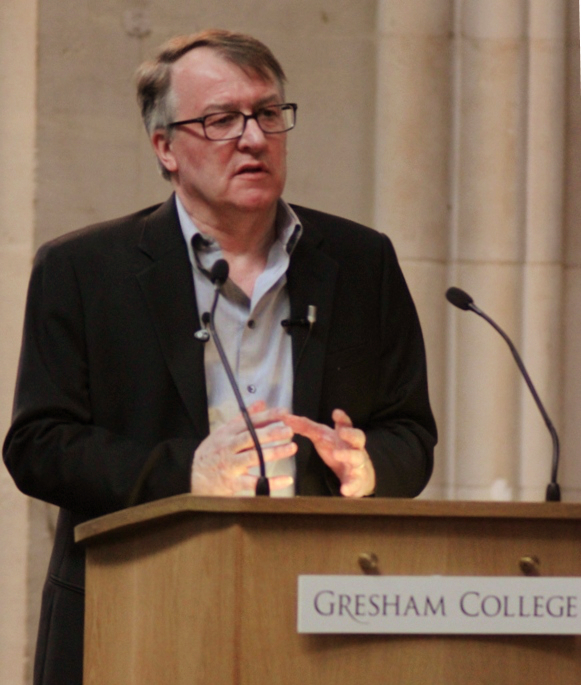
- Stephen Hodder delivering the 2014 Gresham Special Lecture
- Born: 1956 (age 69–70); Stockport, Cheshire, England
- Education: Manchester School of Architecture
- Occupation: Architect
- Awards: Stirling Prize (1996); MBE (1998)
- Practice: Hodder + Partners
- Buildings: Centenary Building, Salford; Wakefield Tower, Manchester
- Design: Corporation St. Bridge, Manchester

Stephen Hodder MBE (born 1956) is an English architect who won the RIBA's Stirling Prize in 1996. He is also a partner at his own practice Hodder Associates which was founded in 1992 in Manchester. In 2012, Hodder was elected for a two-year term as the president of the RIBA (2013–2015).

== Background ==
Hodder started his architectural education in 1975, graduated from Manchester University in 1982 and joined Building Design Partnership but left after a year and set up his own firmp after he was offered a project by a family member. Initially named Hodder Lees Partnership, later Hodder Sanderson, the practice became Hodder Associates in 1992. Hodder's wife Claire is one of the partners in the firm.

He joined the teaching staff at the Manchester School of Architecture. In 2011, he chaired the Professional Advisory Board at the School.

== Awards ==
In 1991, Hodder won the Royal Fine Art Commission/Sunday Times Building of the Year Award for his design of Colne swimming pool in Lancashire in the first year that his practice opened.

In 1995, Hodder Associates won the Grand Prize at the Royal Academy's Summer Exhibition and in 1996 he was awarded the RIBA Stirling Prize for the Centenary Building, University of Salford.

Hodder was appointed Member of the Order of the British Empire (MBE) in 1998 for services to architecture.

He was awarded an Honorary Degree of Doctor of Arts by Manchester Metropolitan University in 2006 in recognition of his distinguished contribution to architecture locally, nationally and internationally.
