= Winchester House =

Winchester House may refer to:

in England

- Winchester Palace, former residence of the Bishops of Winchester in London, also known as Winchester House
- Winchester House, Chelsea, a later former residence of the Bishops of Winchester in London
- Winchester House, Putney, 18th century private club in London

in the United States

- Winchester Mystery House, San Jose, in Santa Clara County, listed on the National Register of Historic Places (NRHP)
- Averitt-Winchester House, Miccosukee, Florida, in Leon County, NRHP-listed
- Winchester House (Louisville, Kentucky), in Jefferson County, NRHP-listed
- Winchester House (Natchez, Mississippi), in Adams County, NRHP-listed

== See also ==
- Winchester Building, Little Rock, Arkansas, formerly known as Winchester Auto Store, NRHP-listed
