= Ross Building =

- U.S. National Register of Historic Places
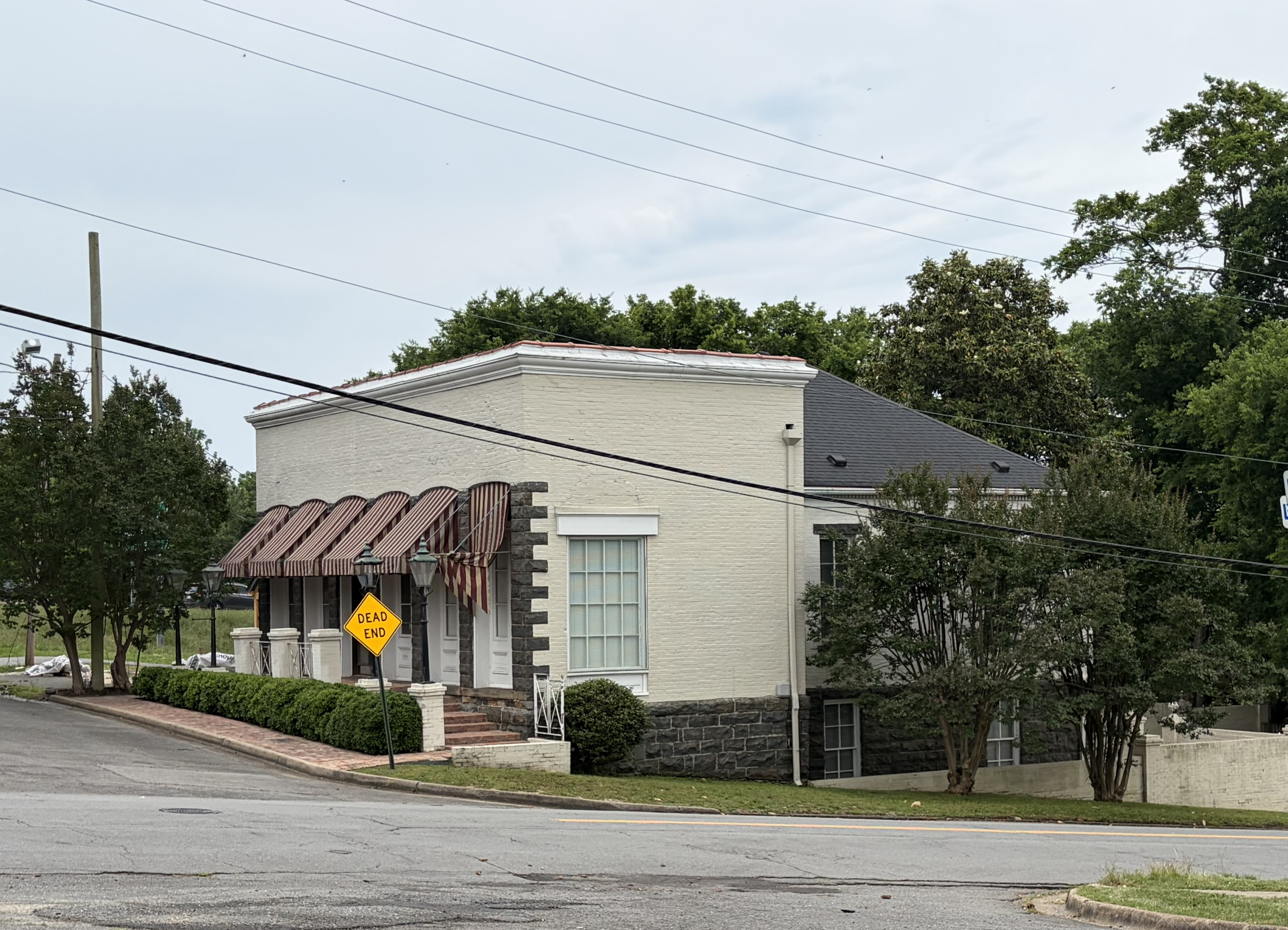
- The Ross Building in 2026

- Location within Arkansas Location within the United States
- Location: 700 S. Schiller St., Little Rock, Arkansas
- Coordinates: 34°44′41″N 92°17′46″W
- Area: .14 acres (0.057 ha)
- Built: 1896
- NRHP reference No.: 100003334
- Added to NRHP: January 24, 2019

The Ross Building is a historic commercial building at 700 South Schiller Street in Little Rock, Arkansas. It is a single-story masonry structure, whose front facade features five bay windows sheltered by awnings, and a high parapet with cornice above. A major extension to the rear is covered by a hip roof, and includes space historically used both by its retail tenants and as residences for owners and employees. The building was built in 1896–97, and originally housed a grocery store serving the area's predominantly German-American population. It has since gone through a significant number of other commercial uses; although its exterior retains many original features, its interior has been heavily modified.

The grocery store was owned and operated by Charles E. Ross, who was born in Germany in 1846 and immigrated in 1871, until 1930. The name of the grocery store is not clear from any available records, but it may have been called the Chestnut Store; a chestnut was a popular holiday item in Germany. The building was occupied by a mattress factory from 1935 to 1960. It was then bought by Moise Seligman Jr. (October 8, 1918 – July 10, 2009). Seligman served in World War II including in the North African campaign, ending as a Lieutenant-Colonel, and later served in the Army Reserves, rising to Major General, its highest rank. He commanded the 122nd ARCOM during the Vietnam War. He was on the Greater Little Rock Chamber of Commerce and served on the Wilbur Mills Highway Commission and later on the planning commission for the I-630, which began construction in 1969. Original plans were to run it right through the Ross Building property, but the highway's completion was delayed until 1985 due to protests about its route. Seligman may have helped influenced its final route to avoid the store. The building was renovated by Seligman's son (who died in 1973) into a pleasant home for himself and offices in the 1970s, and he operated an antique store there.

It was renovated again in the 1980s by an architectural firm, Polk, Stanley, Wilcox Architects which occupied it until their 2009 merger into a larger firm, the Wilcox Group. The firm, in 2019, then as Polk Stanley Wilcox Architects, was renovating the Winchester Building elsewhere in Little Rock, also National Register-listed in 2019, for its use.

The building was listed on the National Register of Historic Places in 2019.

== See also ==
- National Register of Historic Places listings in Little Rock, Arkansas
