= The Unite Foundation =

Organization

Unite Foundation
- Founded: 2012
- Purpose: Social Mobility
- Headquarters: Bristol, United Kingdom
- Location: United Kingdom
- Chair: John Carter
- Co-Directors: Kate Brown and Fiona Ellison
- Website: thisisusatuni.org

The Unite Foundation is an independent charity in the UK that runs a nationwide accommodation scholarship scheme, supporting estranged and care experienced students with a free home at university. The scholarship takes care of students’ accommodation and bills for up to 3 years at university.

The Unite Foundation also supports All of Us, the community for all estranged and care experienced students in Higher Education across the UK. They provide funding and dedicated team members who work hand in hand with the community to help everyone become better connected on and offline.

== Operation ==
Universities talk about widening participation – but how many ensure every student has a home to go to, so they really can participate?

Rent guarantor requirements are a routine part of student housing, yet they exclude those without family support. It’s time for the sector to take responsibility for removing this barrier.

Most students will need a rent guarantor to secure university halls or private housing.

Imagine how much harder that is if you can’t turn to family members for that support – often the case for young people that have experience of the care system or are estranged from their parents. - Kate Brown

The charity's mission is to address barriers to Higher Education for students who are estranged from their family or who have been through the foster care system. They primarily focus on targeting housing inequalities faced by these students, especially due to the requirement for guarantors or upfront rent in private rental accommodation often faced by student renters in the UK.

The charity currently works with 31 university partners across England and Scotland. While maintaining its independence in terms of governance, the charity works closely with Unite Students, its accommodation partner and principal corporate donor. Unite Students have reportedly donated £18.5 million to the Unite Foundation since 2012.

== Personnel ==
As of January 2026, the charity is chaired by Dr John Carter, former vice chancellor of Edge Hill University. The co-directors of the charity are Fiona Ellison and Kate Brown.

== Partner Universities ==
As of 2026, students on the Unite Foundation scholarship can study at any of the following universities:

Nation	City	Universities
England	Bath	Bath Spa University
England	Birmingham	Aston University
England	Bournemouth	Bournemouth University
England	Bristol	University of the West of England (UWE); University of Bristol
England	Leeds	Leeds Beckett University
England	Leicester	De Montfort University
England	Liverpool	Liverpool John Moores University
England	London	Brunel University London; Queen Mary University of London; University of Westminster; King's College London; London Metropolitan University; University College London (UCL)
England	Manchester	University of Salford; Manchester Metropolitan University
England	Portsmouth	University of Portsmouth
England	Sheffield	Sheffield Hallam University; University of Sheffield
Scotland	Edinburgh	Edinburgh Napier University; University of Edinburgh
Scotland	Glasgow	University of Strathclyde; Glasgow Caledonian University

== Impact ==
The Unite Foundation publishes a report of its activities and impact annually. As of 2025, the charity claimed to have provided scholarships to 813 students since its inception 2012.

Notably, one of its previous scholarship recipients, Nyomi Rose, went on to become a trustee of the charity. She said:

The Unite Foundation holds a very special place in my heart, after being awarded the scholarship back in 2018 to pursue my dream of further education. Joining the board allows me to provide a real-life perspective of how the Unite Foundation can support as many estranged and care leavers as possible.
