= Centenary Building =

University of Salford building (1995–2025)

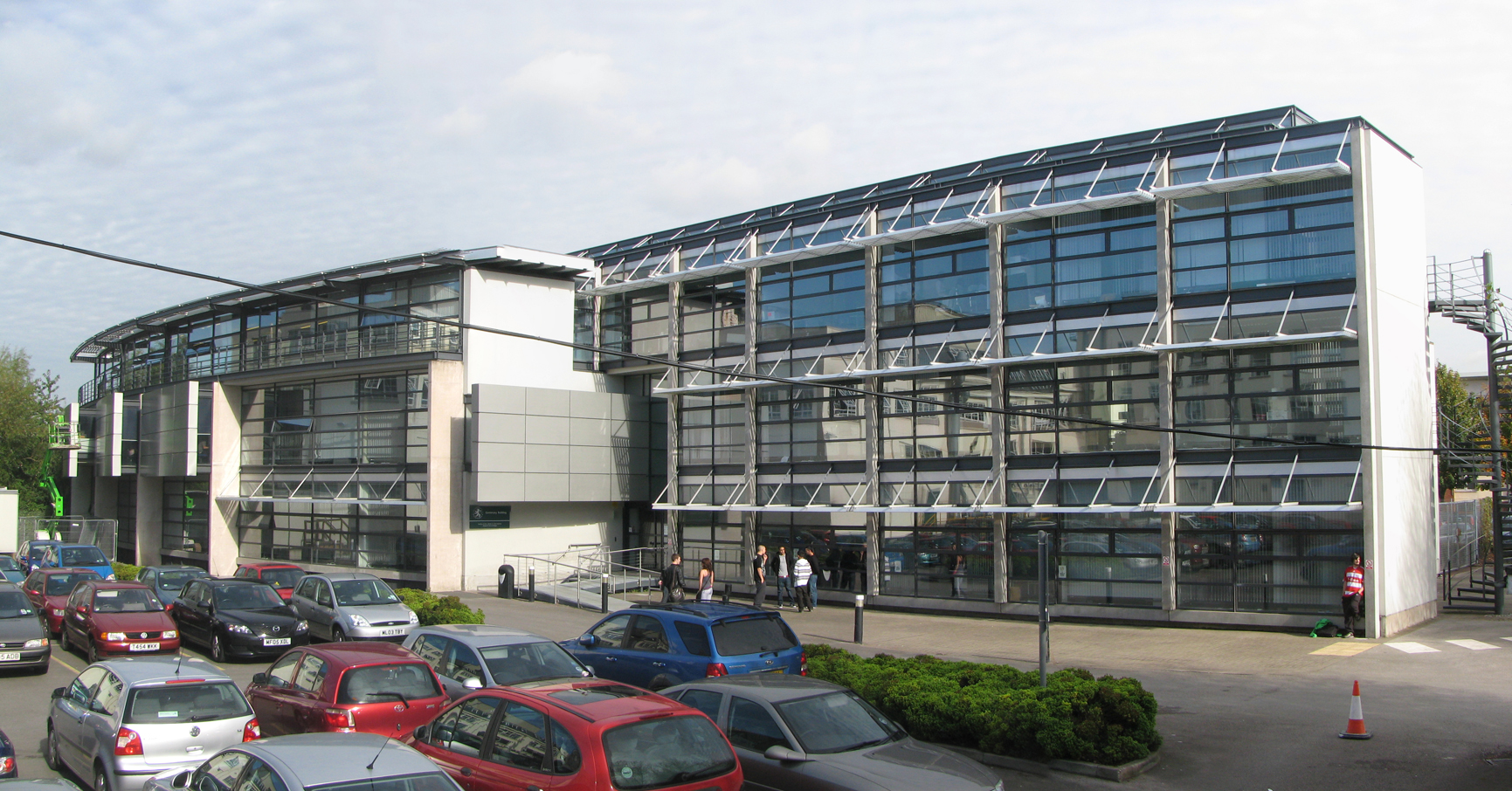
- The Centenary Building in 2009

- Location within Greater Manchester

General information
- Status: Demolished
- Location: Salford, England
- Coordinates: 53.4864°N 2.2633°W
- Construction started: June 1994
- Completed: December 1995
- Demolished: 2025
- Cost: £3.2 million
- Client: University of Salford

Design and construction
- Architect: Stephen Hodder
- Structural engineer: AMEC
- Awards and prizes: Stirling Prize (1996); RIBA Award (1996); RIBA Architecture in Education Category Award (1996); Civic Trust Award (1998)

The Centenary Building was a building at the University of Salford in Salford, England. It was designed by the architect Stephen Hodder, completed in December 1995, and opened in 1996. The building won the RIBA Award and inaugural Stirling Prize in 1996, as well as the Civic Trust Award in 1998.

In October 2024, the Twentieth Century Society submitted a listing application for the building citing its architectural significance. In November 2024, the university announced plans to demolish the building as part of a redevelopment scheme. The plans were met with opposition, including from the original architect. Demolition subsequently commenced in early 2025 and was completed by the end of October.

== Site and brief ==
The site was situated on the edge of the city of Manchester and lay within the campus of the University of Salford. The brief called for a building that would be a "fusion of design and technology" to house the Spatial, Graphic and Industrial Design Department of the university. Hodder had 11 weeks to finish the design stage and begin development on site in order to ensure the European Union grant was eligible and it was built for less than £4 million.

== Architecture ==
It consisted of two separate glazed structures set as a frame to an informal galleried atrium, with service towers, studio and seminar accommodation housed within a four-storey orthogonal block on the "City side" of the development.

The connection between the two blocks was formed by a raised street within which all horizontal circulation was contained in galleries. Working details of the escape stair were enclosed in glass block screen. Other materials included stainless steel cladding and concrete. Accommodation included seminar rooms, video-editing suites, and lecture halls.

The building was designed without air conditioning, instead relying on a natural ventilation system and underfloor heating which were hallmarks of its environmentally-friendly construction. However, this led to staff complaints of it being too cold in winter and too hot in the summer. Some rooms had no external windows, relying instead on borrowed light from the central atrium. Outside of rooms, all spaces were designed for transit and thus there were no informal 'social' areas in the building.

The Centenary Building received several awards, including the RIBA Award (1996), the RIBA Architecture in Education Category Award (1996), the inaugural Stirling Prize (1996), and the Civic Trust Award (1998).

== Listing proposal and demolition ==
In 2014 the University of Salford decided to withdraw teaching and research from the Centenary Building and the adjacent Adelphi Building by August 2016. The Centenary Building was later used as a production base for the Channel 4 reality series The Circle from 2019 to 2021.

In October 2024, the Twentieth Century Society submitted a listing application for the Centenary Building. The building had been vacant for several years and had suffered from vandalism. Previous proposals to repurpose the building had not progressed, and the application aimed to protect it amid the ongoing redevelopment of the surrounding area.

In November 2024, the university announced plans to demolish the building as part of a redevelopment of the Adelphi Village area. In its rationale for the decision to demolish the building, the university said the "ageing infrastructure means it no longer meets modern standards and requirements." The design, which featured the visible movement of people and had a lack of sound insulation, made it noisy with the sound of feet on the metal staircases reverberating around the building.

The proposal to demolish the Centenary Building sparked controversy. Stephen Hodder, the building's architect described the building as a key part of his professional legacy, and argued that the building, which was under 30 years old, should not be demolished solely due to ageing infrastructure, as it did not justify the environmental costs of demolition and rebuilding. Hodder also highlighted the contradiction between the university's sustainability goals and the significant carbon emissions that would result from the redevelopment project.

Dr. Carole O'Reilly, a senior lecturer at the university, acknowledged the building's architectural significance but suggested that its failure to meet current needs might justify its demolition.

Conservationists and environmental campaigners, including the Architects Climate Action Network, Architects Declare, the Twentieth Century Society and Don't Waste Buildings, raised concerns about the environmental and cultural loss involved in demolishing an award-winning structure, advocating for adaptive reuse instead, emphasising the building's historical value. In response to the demolition proposal, RIBA board chair Jack Pringle, while not commenting specifically on the Centenary Building, emphasised the importance of the inventive reuse of buildings to achieve a net-zero future. He also suggested that all Stirling Prize-winning buildings should be considered for listing.

Demolition of the Centenary Building commenced in early 2025 and was completed by the end of October.
