= Winchester Auto Store =

- U.S. National Register of Historic Places
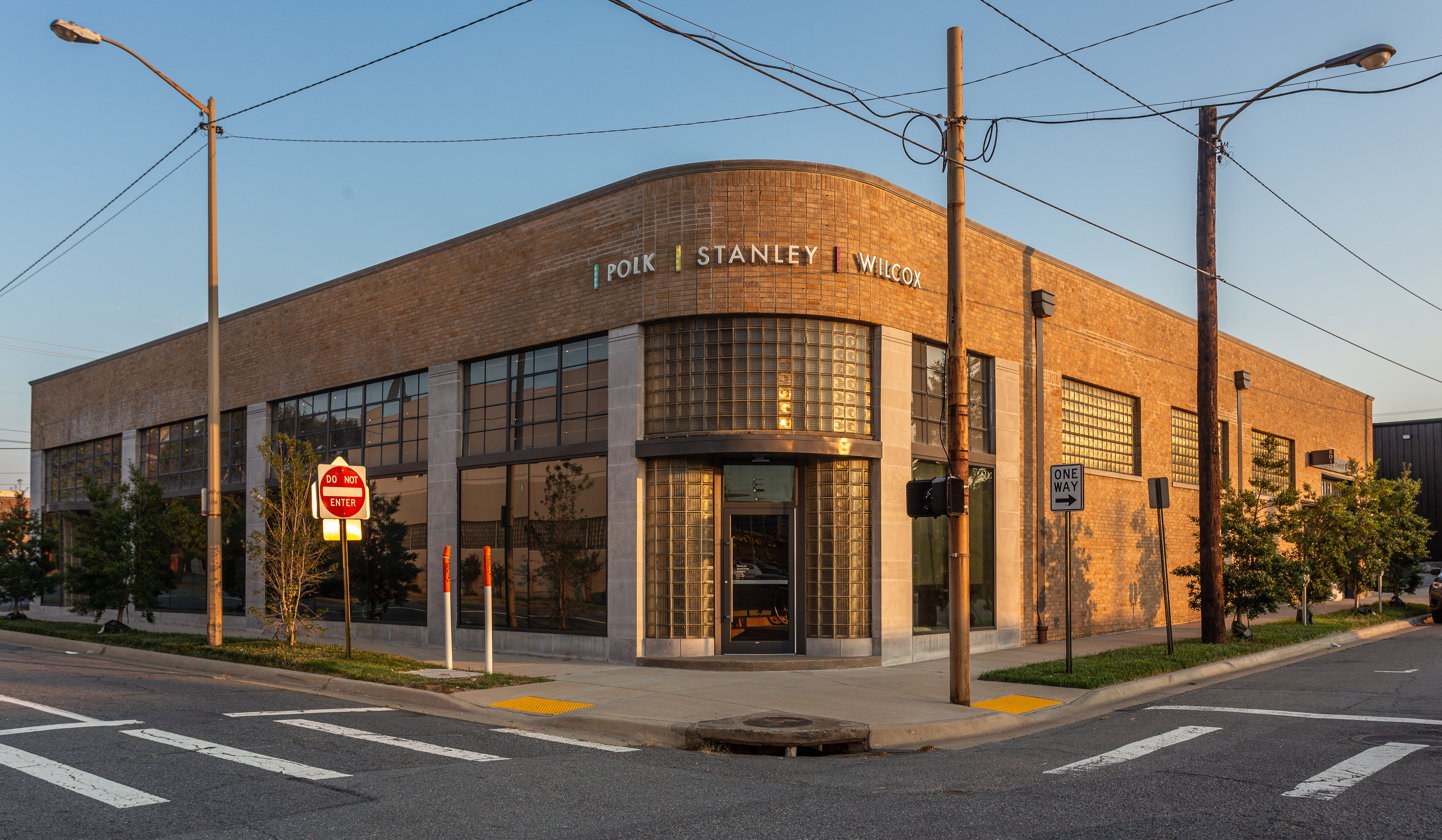

- Location within Arkansas Location within the United States
- Location: 323 W. 8th St., Little Rock, Arkansas
- Coordinates: 34°44′30″N 92°16′30″W
- Area: .32 acres (0.13 ha)
- Built: 1947
- Architectural style: Art Moderne
- NRHP reference No.: 100003337
- Added to NRHP: January 24, 2019

The Winchester Auto Store is a historic commercial building located at 323 West 8th Street (corner of Spring Street) in Little Rock, Arkansas. It has also been known as the Winchester Building. It is a single-story masonry structure, with a rounded corner at the street corner, and a flat roof. Its street-facing facades have metal casement windows, and the main entrance, set in the curved corner, is framed by windows made of glass blocks. It was built in 1947 by Dennis and Maude Winchester to house their retail auto parts store. The Winchester's family business began about 1930, and included stores in Little Rock and Pine Bluff. This building remained in use as an auto parts store until 1978, and has largely been vacant since then. It was sold by the Winchester family in 2016.

By February 2019, the building had been purchased by Polk Stanley Wilcox Architects (PSW), a firm which had once occupied the Ross Building, also National Register-listed in 2019. The firm was renovating it and planned to move into it in late 2019. An application for tax credits for the renovation was approved in 2018.

The building was listed on the National Register of Historic Places in 2019.

== See also ==
- National Register of Historic Places listings in Little Rock, Arkansas
