= Corporation Street Bridge =

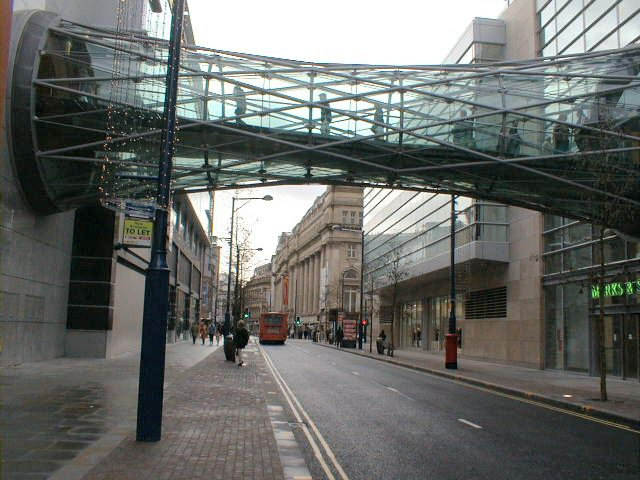
- Coordinates: 53°29′01″N 2°14′36″W
- Crosses: Corporation Street
- Locale: Manchester, England
- Other name: Manchester Arndale Bridge
- Maintained by: Manchester Arndale; Manchester City Council

History
- Architect: Hodder + Partners
- Construction cost: £1 million (1999)
- Opened: 1999

Location
- Interactive map of Corporation Street Bridge

Corporation Street Bridge is a skyway which crosses Corporation Street in Manchester city centre, Manchester. The bridge replaced the old footbridge, which was damaged beyond repair in the 1996 Manchester bombing. The bridge is shaped in the form of a hyperboloid and links the Marks & Spencer/Selfridges building to the Manchester Arndale.

== History ==
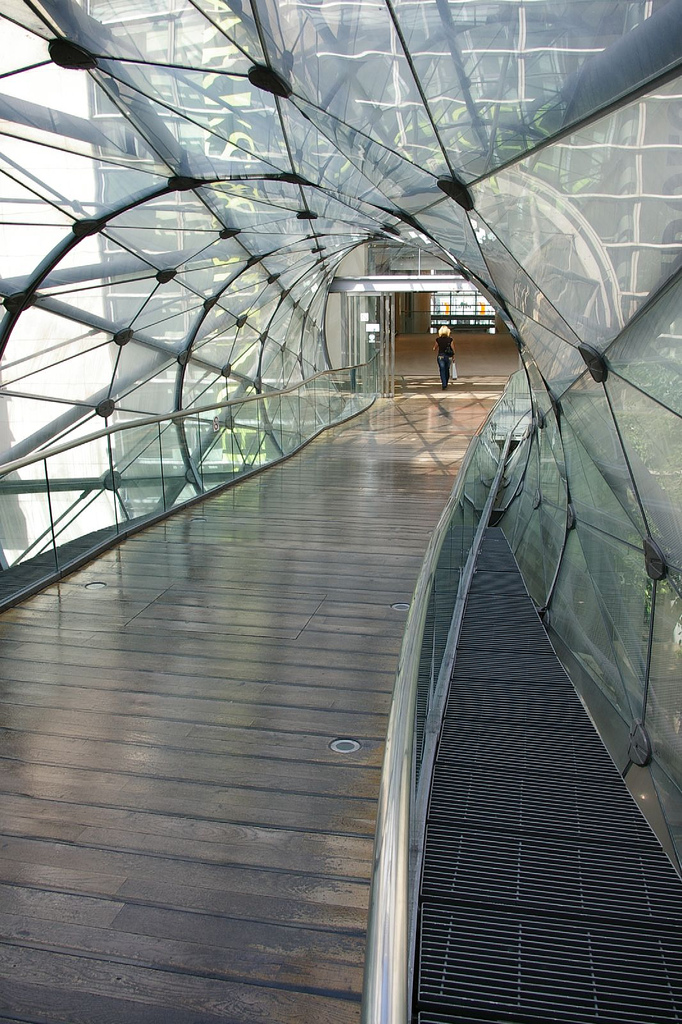
Interior of the bridge.

The new footbridge was proposed by Manchester-based architects Hodder + Partners, whose entry won the design competition in 1997. Construction swiftly began and was soon complete in time for opening in 1999.

The structure has won numerous awards and the new footbridge has symbolised the renaissance of Manchester city centre since the bomb. The bridge was one of the earliest structures to be built after the bomb and overhangs the spot where the bomb exploded.

In 2011, the bridge received a seven-month renovation at a cost of £730,000. Repairs included fixing cracked window panes and permanently replacing floor panels.

== Awards ==
- RIBA Award 2000
- British Constructional Steelwork Association's Structural Steel Award 2000
- American Institute of Architects Award 2000

== See also ==
- Hyperboloid structure
- List of hyperboloid structures
- Vladimir Shukhov
