= Unite Grand Central =

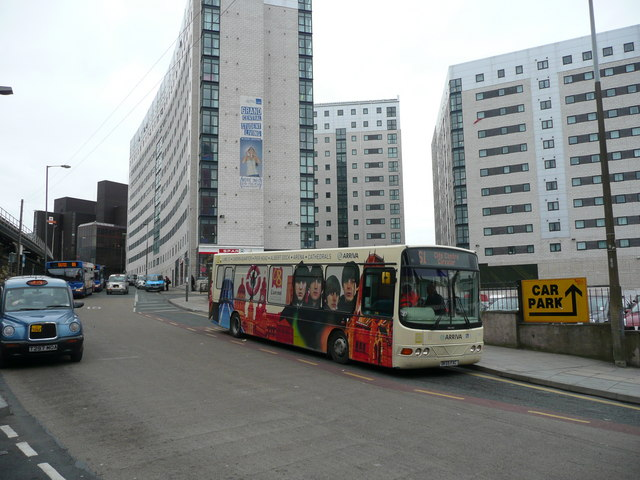

General information
- Type: Student halls of residence
- Location: Liverpool, England, United Kingdom
- Coordinates: 53.4064°N 2.9775°W
- Completed: 2003

Height
- Roof: 37 metres (121 ft)

Technical details
- Floor count: 13

Design and construction
- Developer: Unite Group

Unite Grand Central (also known as Grand Central or Grand Central Halls) is a large complex of privately owned student housing located on Skelhorne Street next to Lime Street station in the centre of Liverpool, England. The buildings are owned by the property developer Unite and are primarily home to students of the University of Liverpool and Liverpool John Moores University. Unite own several other student halls in Liverpool, including Atlantic Point, Cambridge Court, Capital Gate, Cedar House, Horizon Heights, Larch House, Lennon Studios, Moorfield and The Railyard.

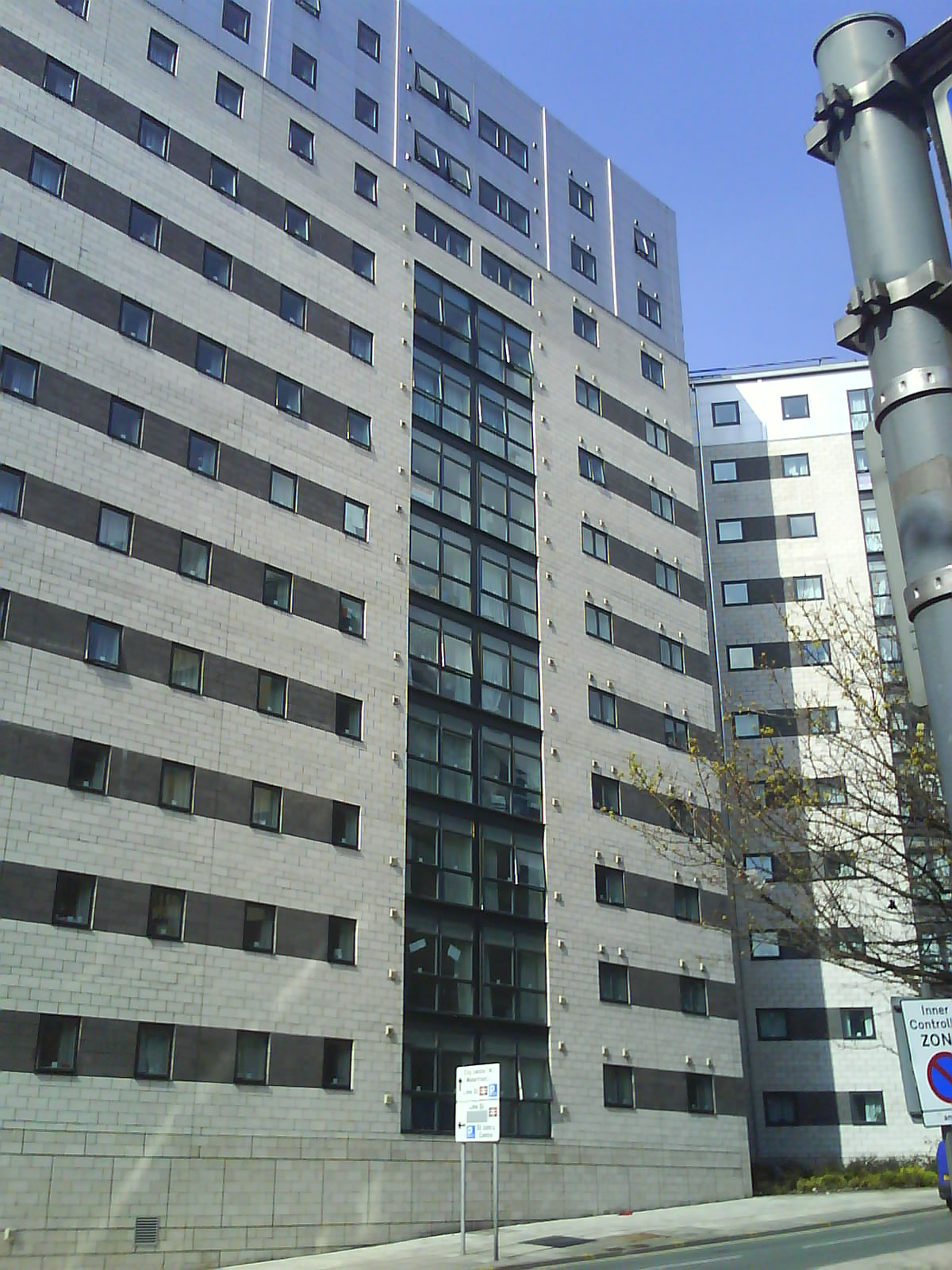
A close up photo of Grand Central

The complex is located on Skelhorne Street in the L3 district of Liverpool and consists of two separate buildings. Grand Central was constructed on the site of a former bus station and was completed in 2003. It is 13 storeys high, making it one of the city's taller halls of residences. There are 1,210 rooms in Grand Central, with three different room types (en-suite, non-ensuite and studio). Unite secured planning permission for a similar development on an adjacent site in 2016.

== See also ==
- List of LJMU halls of residence
- Unite Group
