= Bridgewater Heights =

High-rise building in Manchester, England

Coordinates: 53.47340°N 2.24177°W

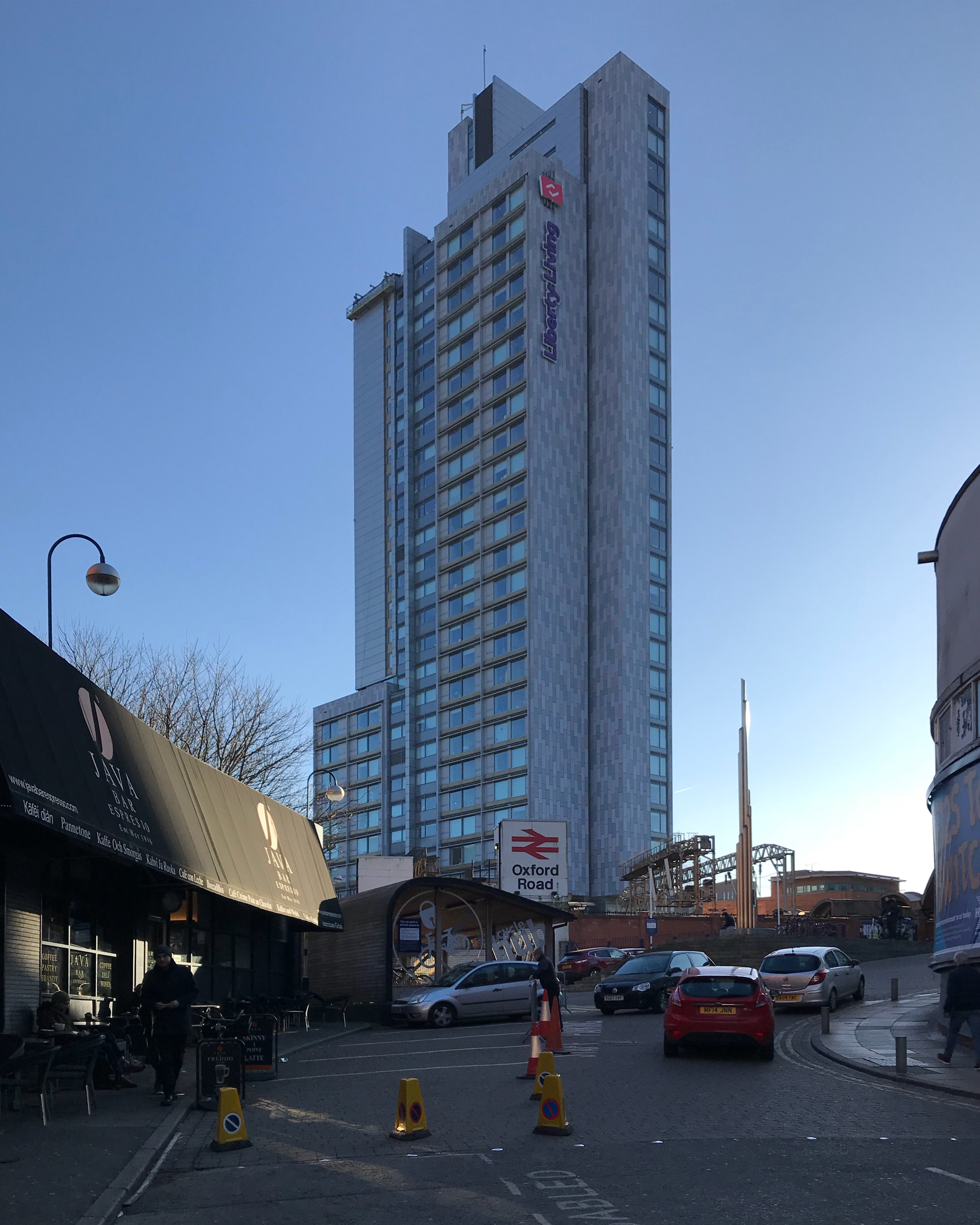
- The tower seen from Oxford Road

- Location within Greater Manchester
- Former names: Student Castle; Liberty Heights

General information
- Status: Completed
- Type: High-rise
- Location: Great Marlborough Street, Manchester, England
- Construction started: 2010
- Completed: September 2012
- Owner: Liberty Living
- Landlord: Liberty Living

Height
- Roof: 106 m (348 ft)

Technical details
- Floor count: 37

Design and construction
- Architects: Hodder and Partners
- Main contractor: Shepherd Construction; Allied Developments

Bridgewater Heights (also known as Liberty Heights, Wakefield Street Tower, or 17 New Wakefield Street) is a high-rise apartment building in Manchester, England, west of Oxford Street.

It was designed by local architect Stephen Hodder in a clustered architectural form and was completed in September 2012. The building is adjacent to Oxford Road railway station, on the corner of Great Marlborough Street. It is 37 storeys tall, with a height of 106 metres (348 ft), and as of June 2026 is the 27th-tallest building in Greater Manchester.

== History ==
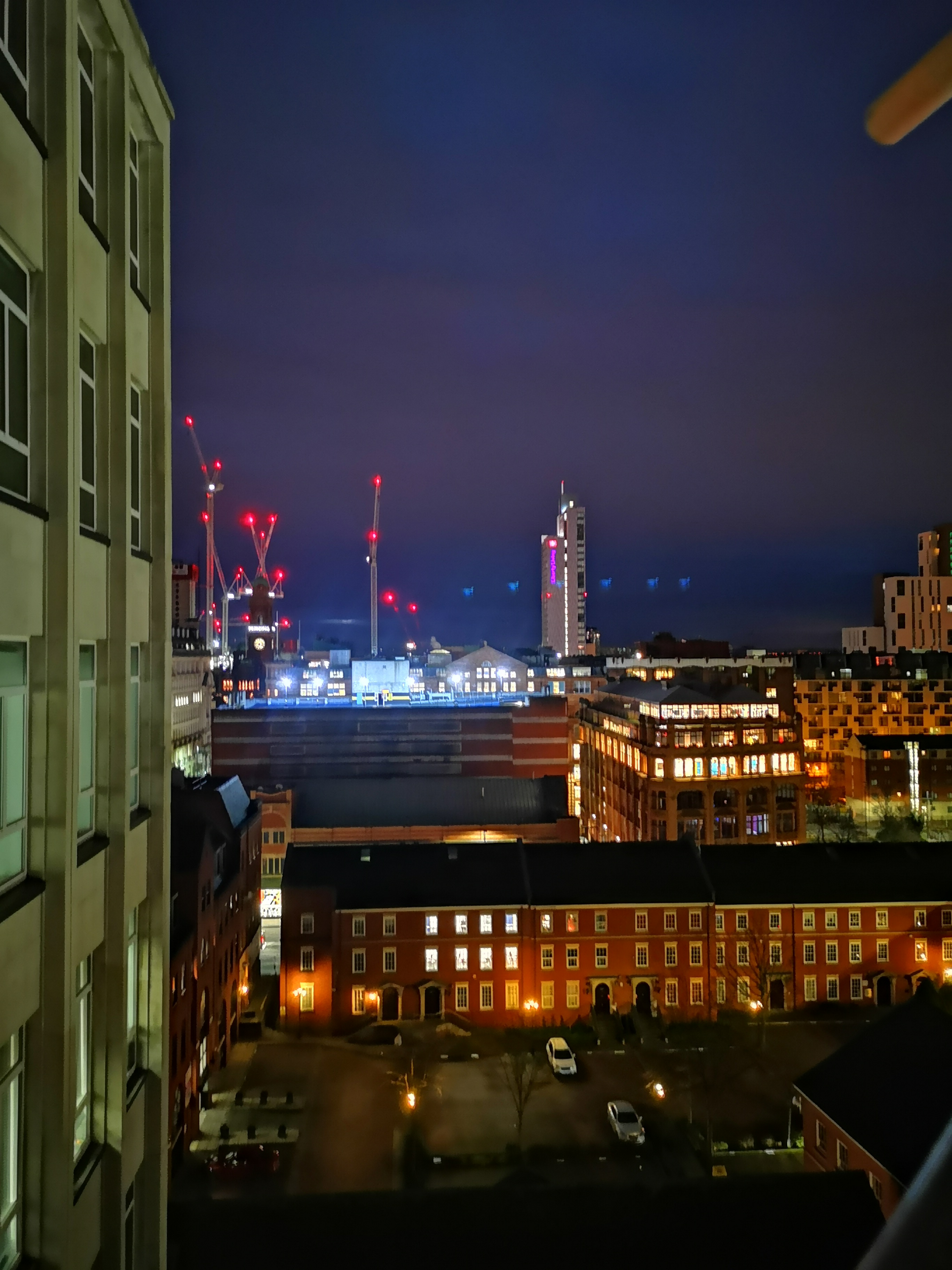
Night side view

Four development schemes were proposed for the site in four years. Plans for a 65 m (213 ft) tall residential tower were proposed in 2006 featuring a design similar to the tower being built. However, despite obtaining planning approval, the proposal was abandoned. In December 2009, the project was revived with a plan for a 106 m (348 ft) tall residential tower.

A planning application was made in early 2010, and planning consent granted in July 2010. Construction work began weeks after consent was granted. By November 2011, the tower had risen in height considerably, and on 18 April 2012, the tower had its topping out ceremony at a height of 106 m (348 ft).

Upon opening, the building was named Student Castle, later renamed to Liberty Heights, and finally Bridgewater Heights.

== Architecture ==
Bridgewater Heights is a residential development of high-rise flats aimed at young people and students. At 106 m (348 ft), it was the tallest purpose-built student accommodation in the world, until being overtaken by Altus House in Leeds, West Yorkshire. Its apparent height is accentuated slightly by its position on a slope. The tower has some resemblance to the Mathematics Tower which also had a clustered exterior but was controversially demolished by the University of Manchester in 2005.

The building has 525 bedrooms in four stepped towers built on a foot area of 7,000 sq ft (650 m^{2}). Plans for a residents' car park were rejected by planners concerned about the impact of a large building and busy location.

== Gallery ==
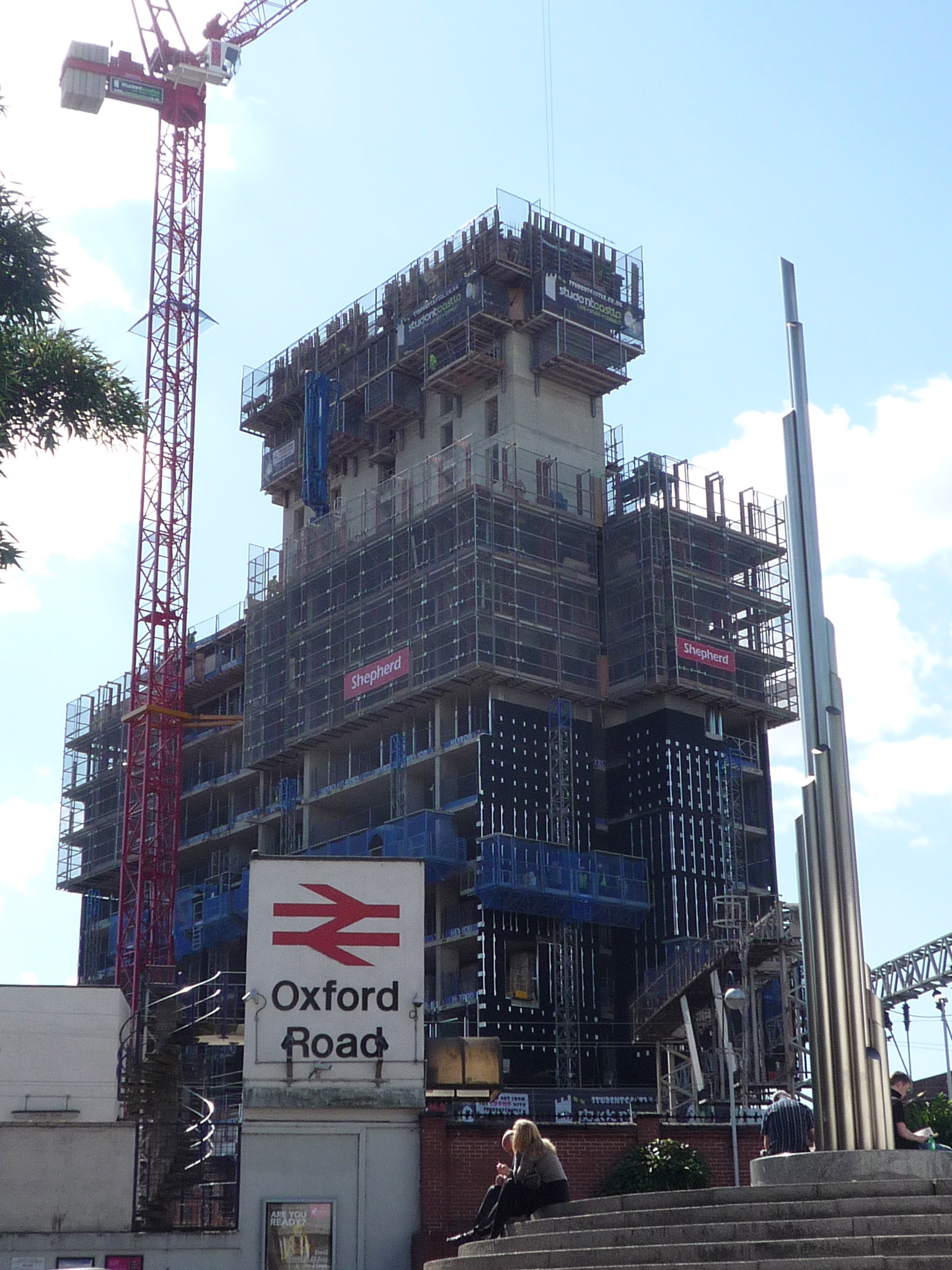
August 2011

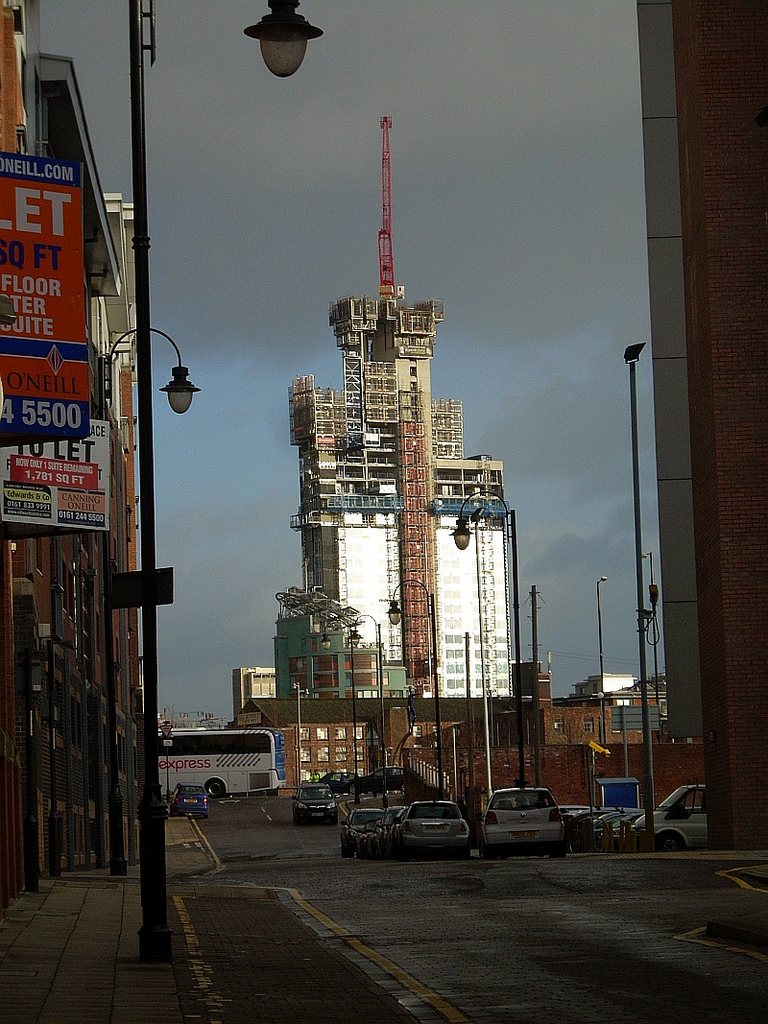
December 2011

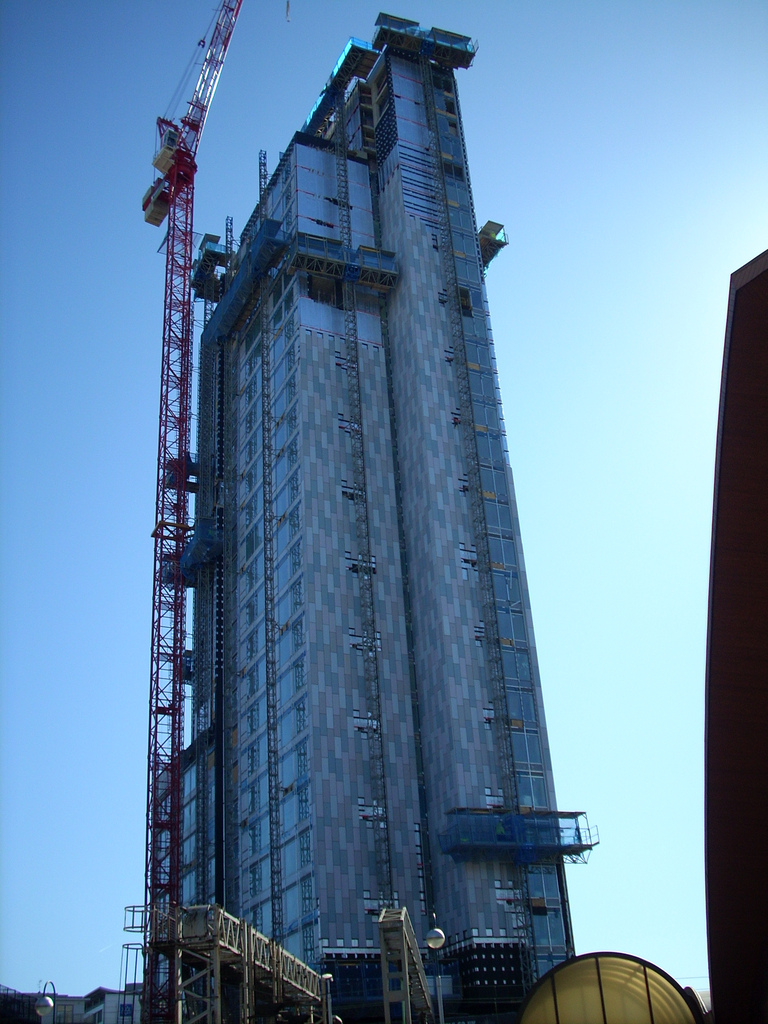
March 2012

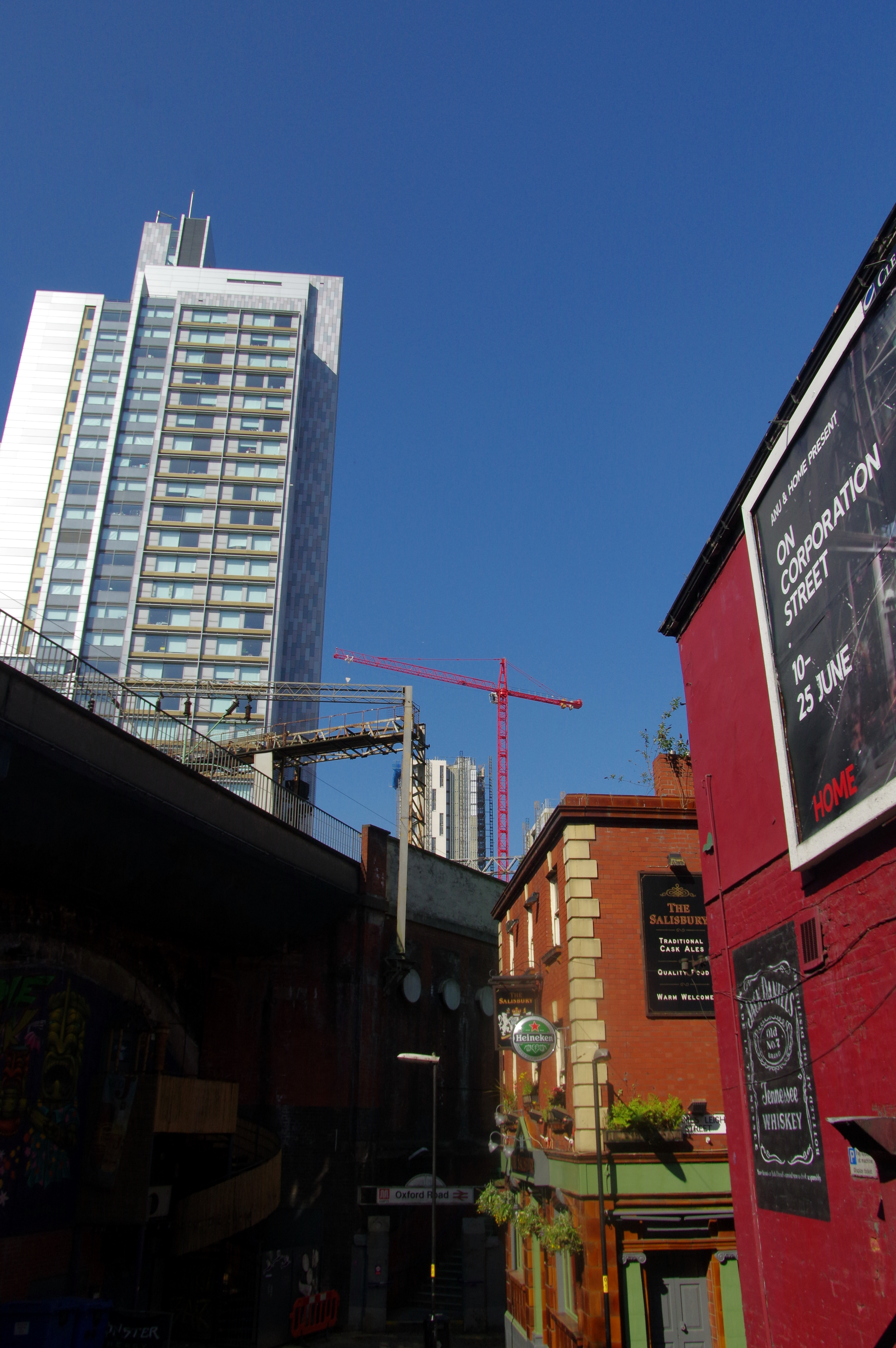

== See also ==
- List of tallest buildings and structures in Greater Manchester
- List of tallest buildings in the United Kingdom
