= Scandinavia House – The Nordic Center in America =

Cultural center in New York City

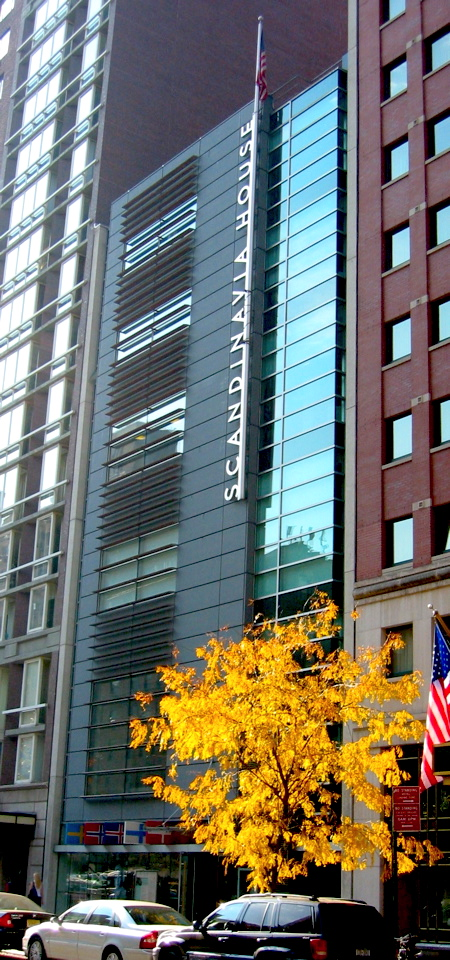
- Scandinavia House
- Established: 2000
- Location: 58 Park Avenue; Manhattan, New York 10016; United States
- Coordinates: 40.749451°N 73.980013°W
- Director: Edward Gallagher
- Architect: James Stewart Polshek of Ennead Architects
- Public transit access: Subway: trains at 33rd Street trains at Grand Central–42nd Street; Bus: M1, M2, M3, M34, M34A, M42, M101, M102, M103
- Website: www.scandinaviahouse.org

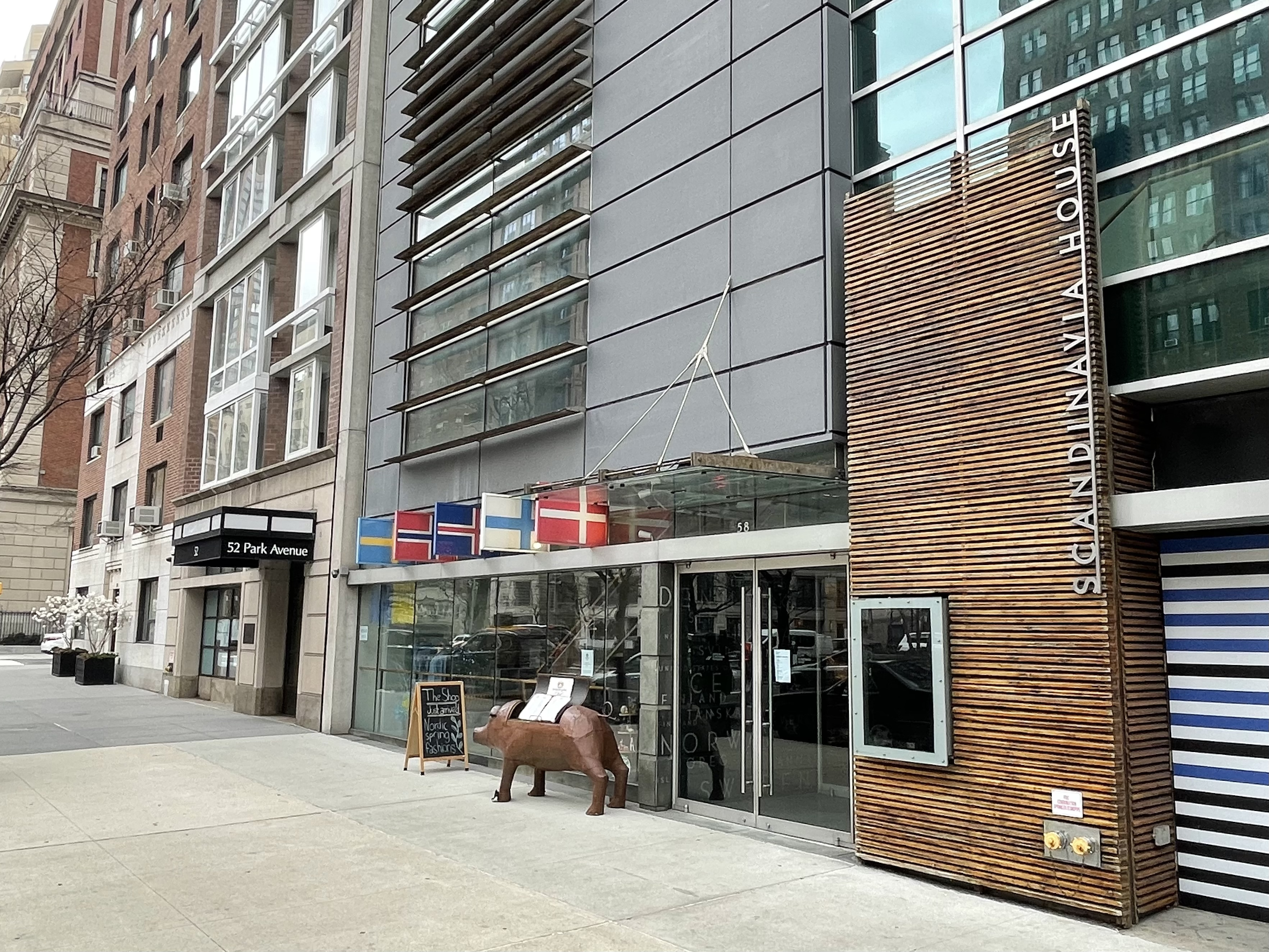
The Scandinavia House Cultural Center at 58 Park Avenue in New York City.

Scandinavia House – The Nordic Center in America is the American-Scandinavian Foundation's cultural center at 58 Park Avenue (between 37th and 38th streets), in Murray Hill, Manhattan, New York City. It is dedicated to preserving the history of the Scandinavian and Nordic countries in the United States through exhibits and programming. This cultural center hosts exhibitions of fine art, design as well as performing arts pieces from Nordic countries. The center also introduces the local population and guests with Scandinavian languages and customs by organizing courses.

The Nordic Center was designed by architect James Stewart Polshek and opened to the public in 2000 with a visit from King Carl XVI Gustaf and Queen Silvia of Sweden and their eldest daughter, Princess Victoria; Princess Martha Louise of Norway; and Princess Benedikte of Denmark.

== History ==
Scandinavia House, located on 58 Park Avenue, Manhattan, was opened in 2000 by the American-Scandinavian Foundation (ASF) as a center for Nordic culture in the United States. The building was the first permanent location of ASF after a decade of moving between several addresses. Construction of the new building cost around $13 million.

According to the ASF website, more than 1.5 million people have visited since then.

The previous building in this location was a 1909 French neoclassical building finished with limestone. It was owned by Grace Rainey Rogers until her death in 1943. Her house was built by real estate developer Horace Trumbauer from Philadelphia. His chief designer was the first African American architect, Julian Francis Abele. During the last decades of the 20th century, the house served as the United Nations mission of the German Democratic Republic. ASF bought it together with the plot of land for $5 million in 1996. Polshek Partnership Architects was contracted to design the new and modern Scandinavia House

According to The New York Times, the president of the ASF, Edward P. Gallagher, stated that it was a "fully public building". It offers a wide range of programs that illuminate the culture and vitality of Denmark, Finland, Iceland, Norway, and Sweden. Scandinavia House offerings include diverse exhibitions and film series, as well as concerts and other performances, readings, lectures, symposia, language courses, and children's activities.

== Building ==
The building is designed in the International Style characteristic of the late 1990s to the early 2000s. It was designed by Polshek Partnership Architects (now Ennead Architects). It has six floors above the ground and two floors below, and is 50 feet (15 m) wide. The building is detailed in minimalist Scandinavian design; the facade is finished with gray and light blue zinc and glass. Initially, it was supposed to be partly covered with wood, a typical building material from Scandinavia, although this idea was later abandoned.

The aim of the building is to exhibit Scandinavian building materials, technological advancement and open, easy-to-transform space. Scandinavia House includes the 168-seat Victor Borge Hall for performances, lectures, and film screenings, a 3rd Floor Gallery presenting ongoing exhibitions of major artists from the Nordic countries, the Heimbold Family Children's Learning Center, which offers regular programs and activities for children and families, and the Halldór Laxness Library.

=== Lower level ===
The Victor Borge Hall combines the best in Scandinavian design with state-of-the-art technology, and can accommodate 168 seated guests. Programming in the hall includes a variety of symposiums, lectures, presentations, concerts, and performances, as well as film screenings each season.

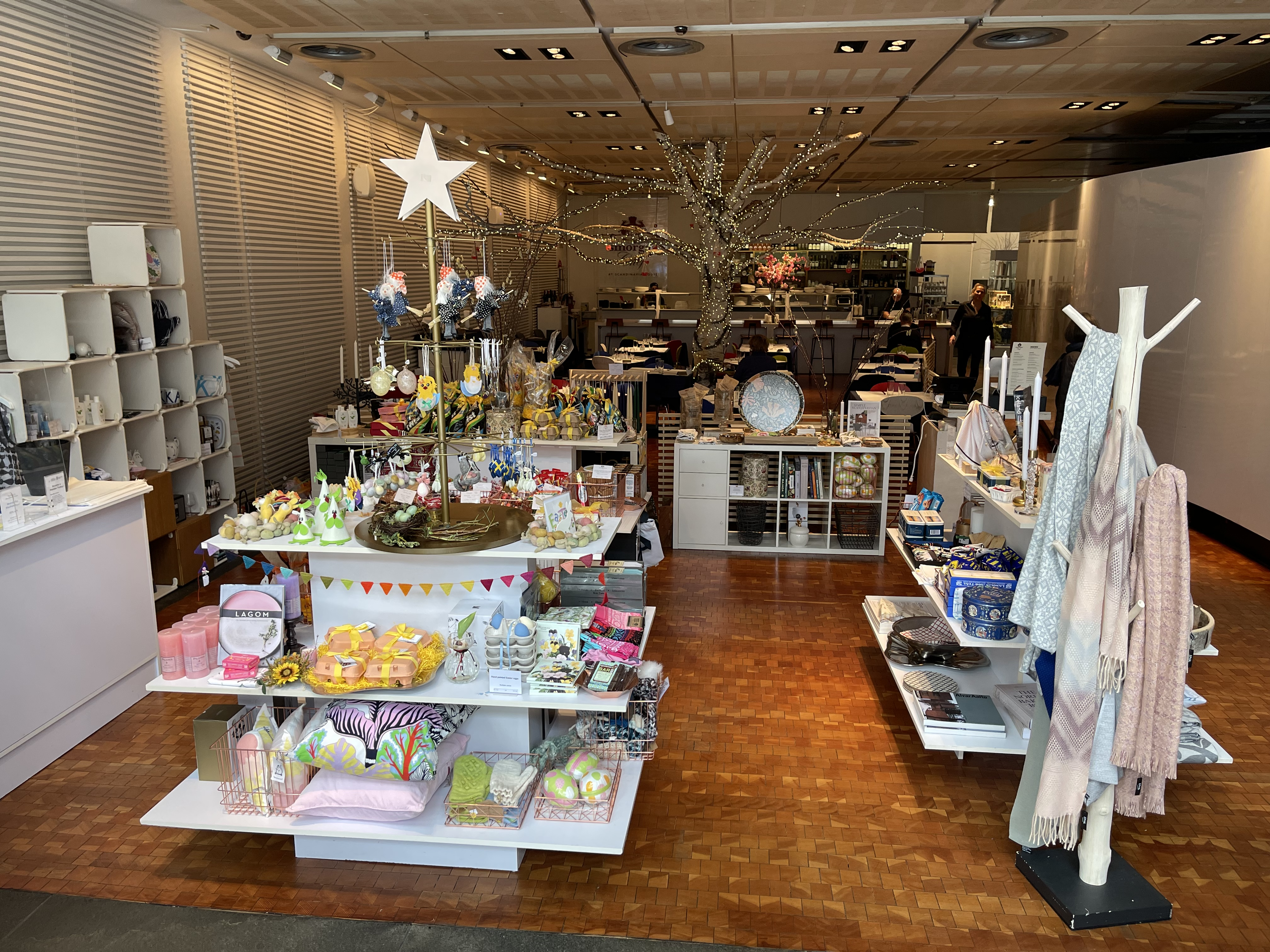
The Scandinavia House gift shop sells Scandinavian design products.

=== Main floor ===
The F. Donald Kenney Reception Area and Taplin Café is a 2,200 square foot space located on the main level of Scandinavia House, overlooking Park Avenue, that houses the Björk Cafe & Bistro. It runs almost the entire length of the main floor, and has an open plan and transparent space. The street-scape can be seen from inside and from street, people can see in the building. It is a common design of late modernism. There is a small gift shop near its entrance which sells Scandinavian design products along with souvenirs and sweets as well as a space in the back that sells clothing, jewelry, books, and textiles.

=== Second floor ===
Volvo Hall is a space with glass walls to its east and west overlooking Park Avenue. It has an adjoining garden terrace with quartzite stone and wood details, offers a setting for outdoor receptions and meeting breaks. Volvo Hall can accommodate up to 250 guests for receptions and 120 for seated dining. The hall is used as showroom space, a place for fashion shows, presentation space, and official gatherings. It houses social events and educational programs carried out by ASF. On this floor there is also an outdoor Wallenius terrace for serving guests of the Scandinavian House during summer.

=== Third floor ===
The Stolt-Nielsen, Gundersen, Ginsberg, and Leif Hoegh Galleries are used for exhibitions of the best Scandinavian painting, sculpture, photography, and design. Exhibitions have included solo exhibitions of noted Nordic artists such as Edvard Munch and Vilhelm Hammershøi, as well group exhibitions presenting major artworks from each of the Nordic countries. Exhibitions are presented alongside related programming including symposia, panel discussions, films, lectures, and art workshops.

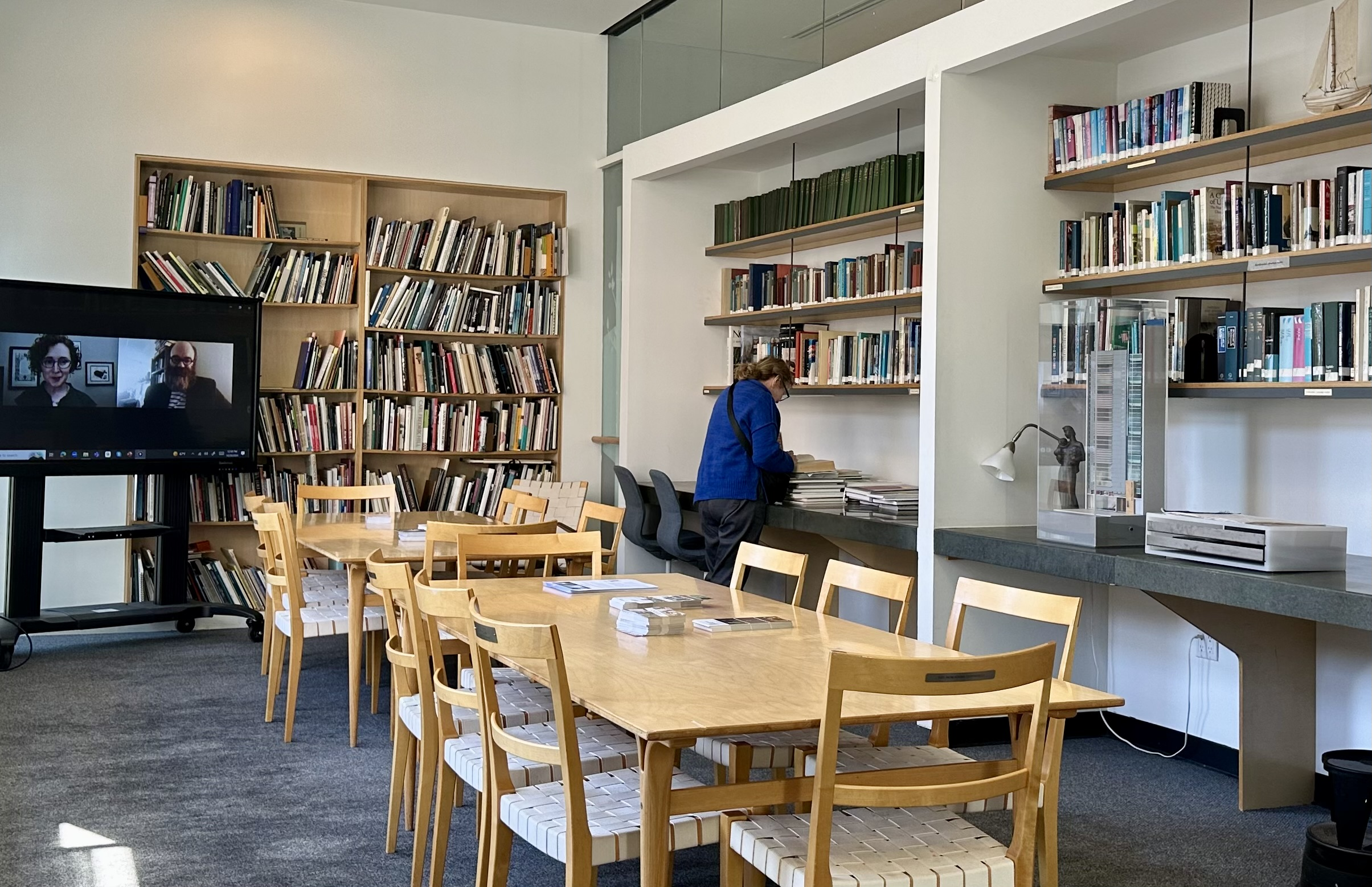
The Scandinavian House Halldór Laxness Library.

=== Fourth floor ===
The Halldór Laxness Library is furnished in classic Scandinavian design. Huge windows overlook Park Avenue, offering an excellent vista of New York landmarks. Computers with internet access are available and a small reading area is adjacent to the main part of the room.

The Heimbold Family Children's Playing and Learning Center is open during the week to children's center members, and open to the public on Saturdays.

=== Fifth and sixth floors ===
The American-Scandinavian Foundation and Scandinavia House offices are located on the fifth and sixth floor. Located on these floors are the Statoil and Teekay Conference Rooms and the Barbro Osher Pro Suecia Foundation Seminar Room.

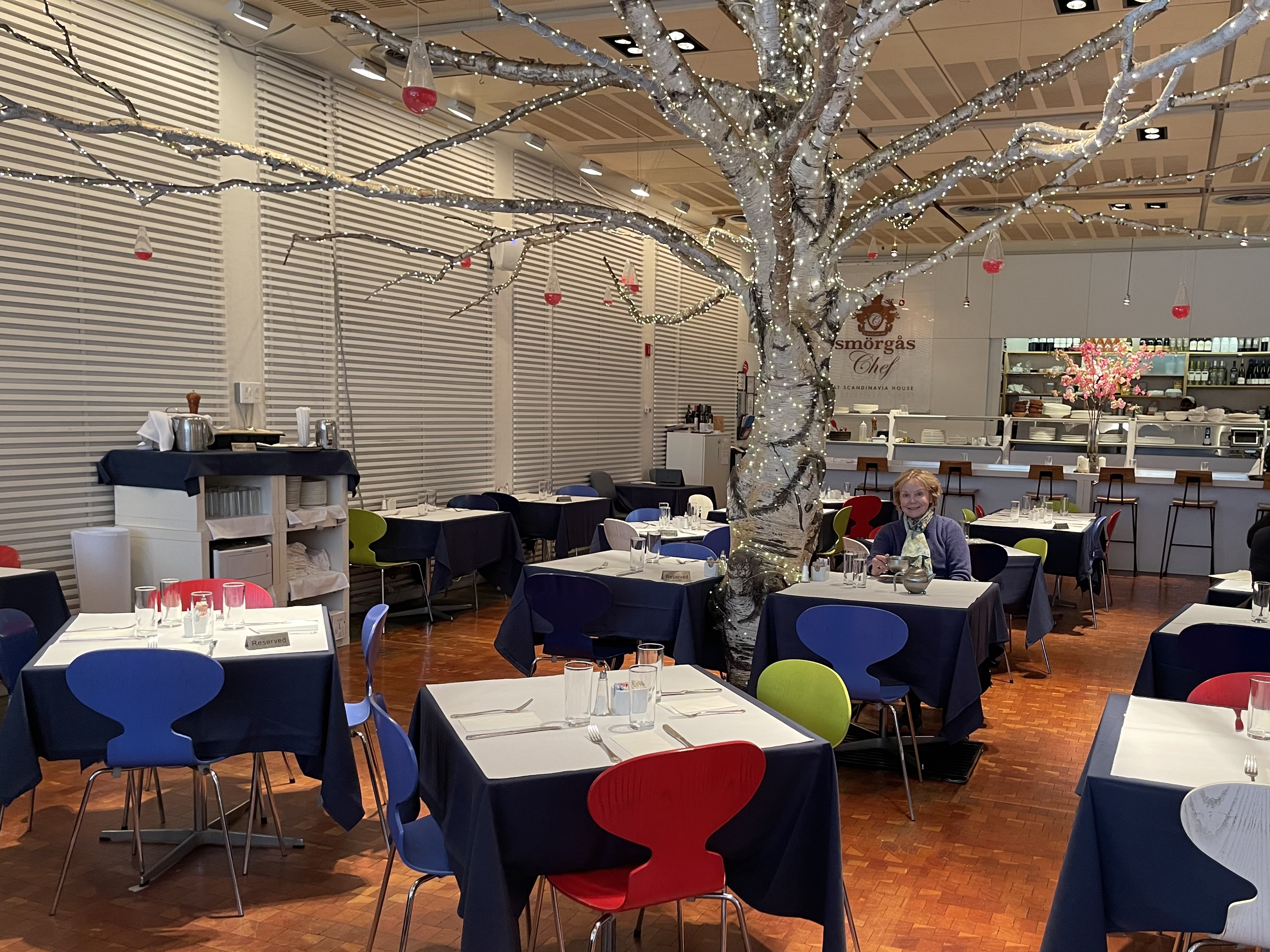
The prior Scandinavia House restaurant, The Smorgas Chef.

=== Restaurant ===
Located on the first floor of Scandinavia House is Björk Cafe & Bistro operated by chef Ulrika Bengtsson and Sabina Lindmark serving Nordic fusion. The prior restaurant was Smorgas Chef, a full-service restaurant that is operated by Morten Sohlberg which closed around 2022 which also operated two more facilities in Wall Street and West Village which also closed as of 2017. The restaurant had used ingredients from its own farm, the Blenheim Hill Farm in the Catskills, which has been in operation since the 1740s. There is also a small area behind

== Financing ==
Scandinavia House has up to 300 donors from the U.S. and abroad. Among them are individuals, corporations, and foundations, as well as the Nordic governments and the Nordic Council of Ministers.

=== The American Scandinavian Foundation ===
Scandinavian House is under the management of the American-Scandinavian Foundation which was founded by Niels Poulson. Poulson was a Danish-American who owned a successful iron manufacturing company, Pulsen & Eger whose name was later changed to Heckla, after an active Volcano in Iceland. In 1910, he founded ASF (initially known as the American Scandinavian Society) which was a publicly funded, non-profit organization. The aim of the organization was to support cultural activities by funding a wide array of fellowships, grants, internships, and published materials. ASF was one of the first non-governmental organizations to promote cultural relations between countries.

The Foundation is governed by a board of trustees of individuals from the United States and Scandinavia, representing diverse interests yet linked by personal or professional ties to the Scandinavian countries. The five Nordic Heads of State serve as the organization's patrons – Carl XVI Gustaf of Sweden, Harald V of Norway, Frederik X of Denmark, Halla Tómasdóttir, and Sauli Ninistö.
