= Gundersen =

Gundersen may refer to:

- Gundersen (surname), people with the surname Gundersen
- The Gundersen method, a method of competition in Nordic combined skiing devised by Gunder Gundersen
- Gundersen Lutheran Medical Center, a tertiary healthcare facility in La Crosse, Wisconsin
- the Gundersen flap, a surgical procedure developed by Trygve Gundersen

== See also ==
- Gunderson (disambiguation)
