= Gunderson =

Gunderson may refer to:

== People ==
Gunderson is a surname of Norwegian and Swedish origin. Notable people with the surname include:

- Lance Armstrong (born Lance Edward Gunderson; 1971), American cyclist
- Carl Gunderson (1864–1933), American politician, South Dakota State Senate
- Eric Gunderson (psychologist) (1923–2015), American psychologist
- Eric Gunderson (born 1966), American Major League Baseball player
- Foluke Gunderson (born 1987), American Olympic volleyball player
- Jerome O. Gunderson (1923–2016), American farmer, businessman, and politician, Minnesota State Senate
- John Gunderson (born 1980), American mixed martial artist
- John G. Gunderson (1923–2019), American psychiatrist
- Lauren Gunderson (born 1982), American playwright, screenwriter, and short story author
- Ryan Gunderson (born 1985), American professional hockey player
- Steve Gunderson (actor), American actor
- Steven Gunderson (born 1951), American politician
- Ted Gunderson (1928–2011), American private investigator and FBI special agent
- Fay Peck (maiden name Gunderson; 1931–2016), American Expressionist painter

== Fictional characters ==
- Alice Gunderson, in the soap opera General Hospital
- Buzz Gunderson, in the movie Rebel Without A Cause
- Gil Gunderson, in The Simpsons
- Marge Gunderson, in the movie Fargo
- Marten Gunderson, a minor villain of the video game Tomb Raider: The Angel of Darkness
- Skye Gunderson, from the animated series Get Blake!
- Walter Gunderson, mayor of Pawnee in Parks and Recreation
- "Screaming" Bob Gunderson, a minor character from Disney's Monsters University

== Other uses ==
- Gundersen Hall, Oklahoma State University, Stillwater, Oklahoma
- Gunderson High School, San Jose, California
- Gunderson, the predecessor to The Greenbrier Companies

== See also ==
- Gundersen (disambiguation)
- Gundersen (surname)
