= Lydia McCarthy =

American artist

Lydia McCarthy (born 1981) is an American artist who lives and works in New York. She is known for her photographs and videos.

McCarthy is the recipient of a fellowship from The American-Scandinavian Foundation and a Lighthouse Works residency.
