= The American-Scandinavian Foundation =

US non-profit organization

- Abbreviation: ASF
- Established: 1910; 116 years ago
- Founder: Niels Poulsen
- Type: Nonprofit
- Headquarters: Scandinavia House
- Location: New York, New York, United States
- Website: www.amscan.org

The American-Scandinavian Foundation (ASF) is an American non-profit foundation dedicated to promoting international understanding through educational and cultural exchange between the United States and Denmark, Finland, Iceland, Norway, and Sweden. The Foundation's headquarters, Scandinavia House: The Nordic Center in America, is located at 58 Park Avenue, New York City.

== History ==
ASF was founded in 1910 by the Danish-American industrialist Niels Poulsen, founder of the Hecla Iron Works. It is a publicly supported 501(c)(3) non-profit organization that carries out an extensive program of fellowships, grants, intern and trainee J-1 visa sponsorship, publishing, membership offerings, and cultural events.

The foundation is governed by a board of trustees of individuals from the United States and Scandinavia, representing diverse interests, yet linked by personal or professional ties to the Scandinavian countries. The five Nordic heads of state serve as the organization's patrons: Carl XVI Gustaf of Sweden, Harald V of Norway, Frederik X of Denmark, Halla Tómasdóttir, and Alexander Stubb. In addition, Princess Benedikte of Denmark, Princess Märtha Louise of Norway, Martti Ahtisaari, Victoria, Crown Princess of Sweden, and Vigdís Finnbogadóttir have been named as honorary trustees.

In October 2011 the Foundation celebrated its first 100 years with a series of events attended by Scandinavian heads of state. The centenary exhibition, Luminous Modernism: Scandinavian Art Comes to America, 1912, was opened by Queen Sonja of Norway on 20 October 2011, in the presence of King Harald, King Carl XVI Gustaf and Queen Silvia of Sweden, Crown Princess Mary of Denmark, and Finnish President Tarja Halonen.

== Educational programs ==
More than 26,000 young Americans and Scandinavians have participated in ASF's exchange programs of study, research or practical training. Many of its alumni have gone on to leading positions in business, government and the arts. The Foundation cultivates enduring academic, professional, and personal ties between the U.S. and the Nordic countries.

The Foundation's internship and training programs enable young Americans and Scandinavians living abroad to receive practical working experience in fields such as engineering, shipping, law, finance, agriculture, and technology. Language classes at Scandinavia House are offered and accredited through the New York University's School of Continuing and Professional Studies.

Each year the ASF awards more than $800,000 in fellowships and grants to individual students, scholars, professionals, and artists—either Scandinavians studying or conducting research in the United States or Americans studying or conducting research in Scandinavia.

Through its public project grants, the ASF funds a wide variety of programs that bring American and Scandinavian culture, art, and thought to public audiences. Grants are awarded to arts and educational institutions adding a Nordic focus to their programming, as well as to smaller organizations with a more regional focus. In 2005–2006, 65 projects throughout the U.S. and Scandinavia received $250,000 in total funding. In 2006–2007, an additional $221,000 was awarded to 62 projects.

== Publishing ==
The American-Scandinavian Foundation's quarterly journal, Scandinavian Review, is the oldest publication of its kind in the United States. It covers all aspects of life in contemporary Scandinavia with an emphasis on areas in which Scandinavian achievement is renowned: art and design; industrial development; and commercial, political, economic, and social innovation. Leading journalists and writers on both sides of the Atlantic write for it.

The Foundation also publishes books, including the occasional series Scandinavian Classics and Scandinavian Monographs, both of which began in 1914. The annual ASF translation competition is awarded for the most outstanding translations of poetry, fiction, drama or literary prose written by a Scandinavian author born after 1900.

== Scandinavia House ==
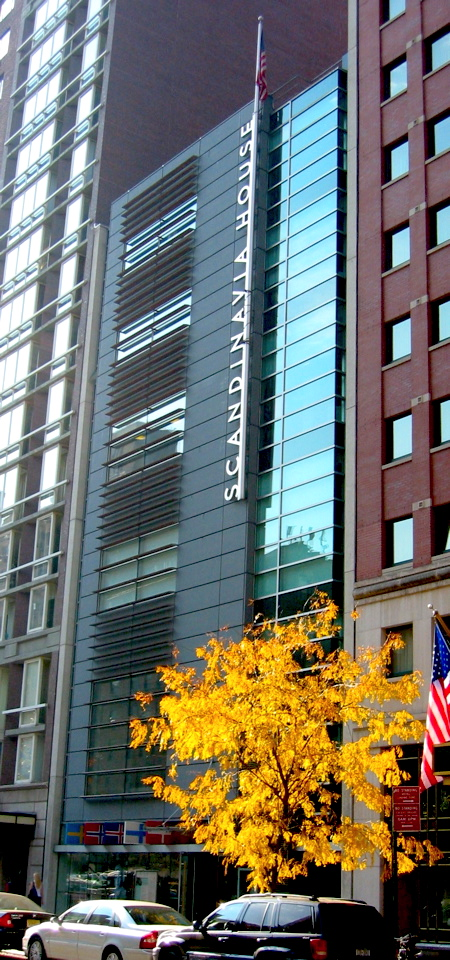
Scandinavia House, headquarters of The American-Scandinavian Foundation, on Park Avenue in New York City

The American-Scandinavian Foundation's cultural center, Scandinavia House: The Nordic Center in America, is located at 58 Park Avenue, between 37th and 38th Streets in the Murray Hill neighborhood of Midtown Manhattan. The ASF presents a wide range of cultural programs at Scandinavia House, including art and design exhibitions, films, concerts, lectures, and children's programs representing all facets of Nordic culture. The building was designed by the architect James Stewart Polshek and opened to the public in 2000.
