= Clinton Presidential Center =

Presidential library

William J. Clinton Presidential Library and Museum

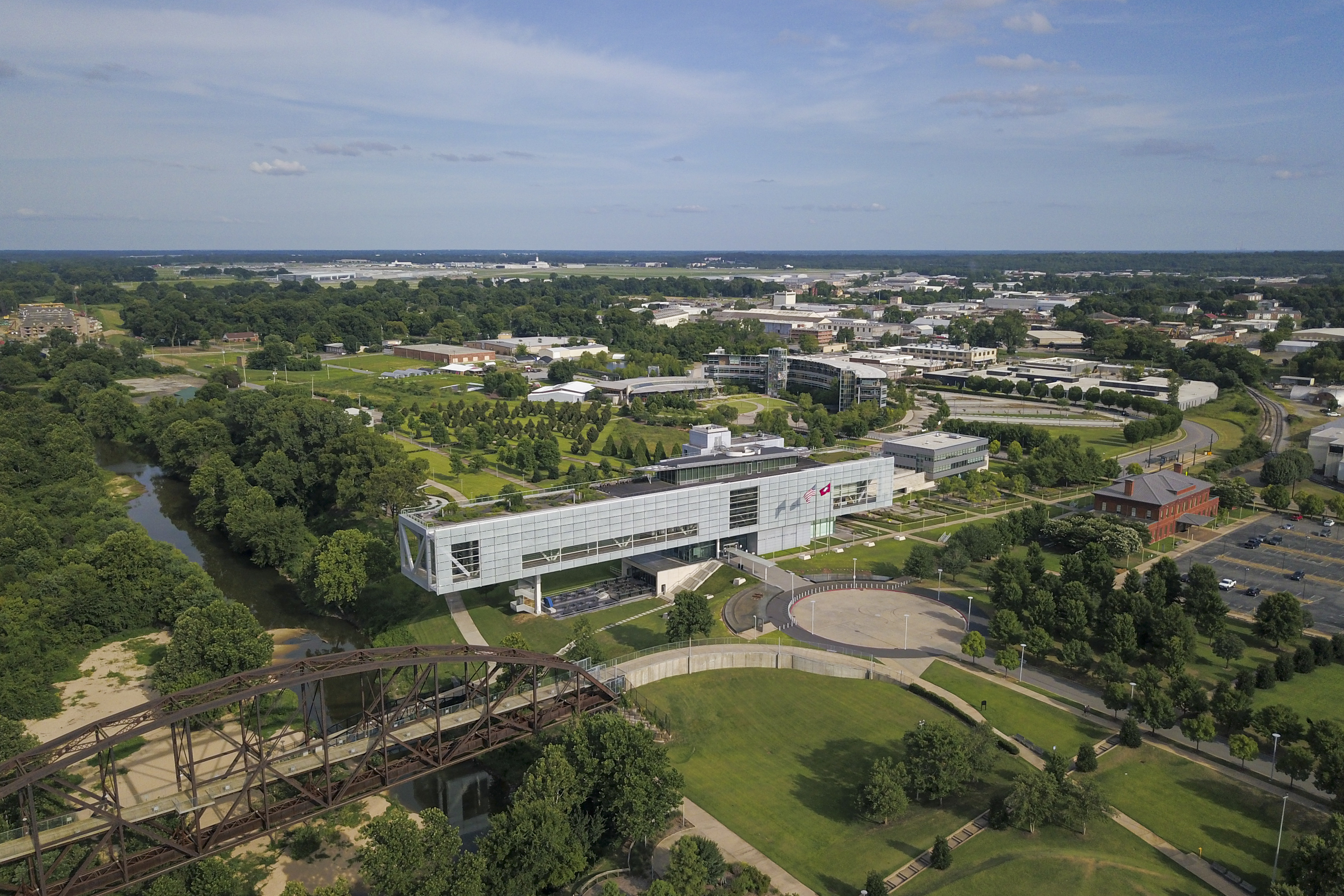
- Aerial photo of the William J. Clinton Presidential Center and Park (center) and the Clinton School of Public Service (right)

- Location within Arkansas Location within the United States

General information
- Location: 1200 President Clinton Avenue, Little Rock, Pulaski County, Arkansas, United States
- Coordinates: 34°44′47″N 92°15′30″W
- Named for: William Jefferson "Bill" Clinton
- Construction started: December 5, 2001; 24 years ago
- Inaugurated: Dedicated on November 18, 2004; 21 years ago
- Cost: $165 million USD
- Operator: National Archives and Records Administration

Technical details
- Size: 152,000 square feet (14,100 m^{2})

Design and construction
- Architect: Polshek Partnership

Website
- www.clintonfoundation.org/clinton-presidential-center

The William J. Clinton Presidential Library and Museum is the presidential library of Bill Clinton, who served as the 42nd president of the United States from 1993 to 2001. It is located in Little Rock, Arkansas, and includes the Clinton Presidential Library, the offices of the Clinton Foundation, and the University of Arkansas Clinton School of Public Service. It is the thirteenth presidential library to have been completed in the United States, the eleventh to be operated by the National Archives and Records Administration, and the third to comply with the Presidential Records Act of 1978.

It is situated on 17 acres (69,000 m^{2}) of land located next to the Arkansas River and Interstate 30 and was designed by architectural firm Polshek Partnership, LLP with exhibition design by Ralph Appelbaum Associates. Polk Stanley Wilcox Architects also contributed. The main building cantilevers over the Arkansas River, echoing Clinton's campaign promise of "building a bridge to the 21st century". With a 68,698-square-foot (6,382.3 m^{2}) floor plan, the library itself is the largest presidential library in terms of physical area, although the Ronald Reagan Presidential Library has the greatest space overall, due to its addition of the 90,000 square feet (8,400 m^{2}) Air Force One Pavilion in 2005. The library contains approximately 2.6 million photographs, 12,400 video recordings, 12,000 audio recordings, 80 million documents, 21 million e-mails, and 79,000 artifacts related to Clinton's presidency. The Clinton Library is also the most expensive, with all funding coming from 112,000 private donations.

The museum showcases artifacts from Clinton's two terms as president and includes full-scale replicas of the Clinton-era Oval Office and Cabinet Room.

== History ==
Preliminary planning for the library (including the site choice) began in 1997, while groundbreaking for the complex occurred on December 5, 2001. Early estimates put the library's cost at about $125 million. In 2001, the Clinton Foundation hoped to gather $200 million in donations to cover project costs. In the end, the entire project cost $165 million in private funding, with an additional $11.5 million of land given by the City of Little Rock to construct and covers 152,000 square feet (14,100 m^{2}) within a 28 acres (110,000 m^{2}) park.

Fund-raising for the center was led by Terry McAuliffe, a friend of Clinton's who had also contributed heavily to the Clinton-Gore campaign in 1995. Clinton himself was prohibited by law from personally soliciting donations for the center, but he did host private events relating to the library. There were no other legal restrictions on donations, and the Clinton Foundation was able to accept unlimited private donations, all of which were tax deductible. Approximately $10 million of contributions came from Saudi Arabia. However, the Clinton Foundation declined to release a full donor list, similar to the Ronald Reagan Presidential Library (although the foundation later agreed to disclose the top 150 donors to the House Government Reform Committee). Donations exceeding $1 million were also given from various other foreign governments (such as Kuwait and Taiwan), as well as foreign individuals. Various American organizations also contributed millions of dollars to the foundation.

=== Dedication ceremony ===
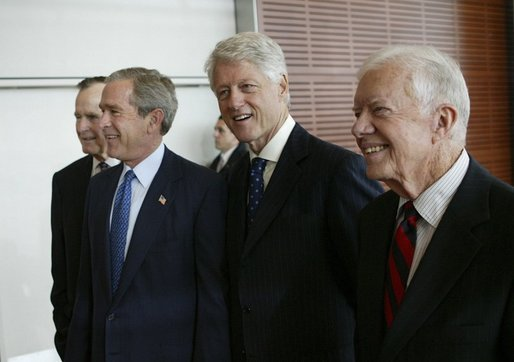
Then-President George W. Bush along with former U.S. presidents George H. W. Bush, Bill Clinton, and Jimmy Carter at the library's dedication

The Clinton Presidential Center was dedicated on November 18, 2004. Although it was raining, the ceremony was attended by approximately 30,000 people (including notable figures such as Willie Mays, Robin Williams, and Barbra Streisand) and included a 20-minute speech made by Clinton, who had recently undergone bypass surgery. It also included performances by Bono, the African Drum Ballet and the Philander Smith Collegiate Choir, as well as an invocation given by Floyd Flake and video tribute from Nelson Mandela. Four U.S. presidents (Clinton, Jimmy Carter, George H. W. Bush, and George W. Bush were present; former president Gerald R. Ford could not attend due to health concerns) were on the same stage together. All three other presidents spoke at the event as well. Overall, the ceremony lasted two hours and featured six speakers.

=== Fifth anniversary ===
On November 17, 2009, the library's fifth anniversary saw Clinton giving a speech to approximately 1,000 people, urging the passage of health-care reform and the reduction of energy use. He specifically mentioned the center and school as places where discussion on such topics could take place.

== Complex ==
=== Main building ===
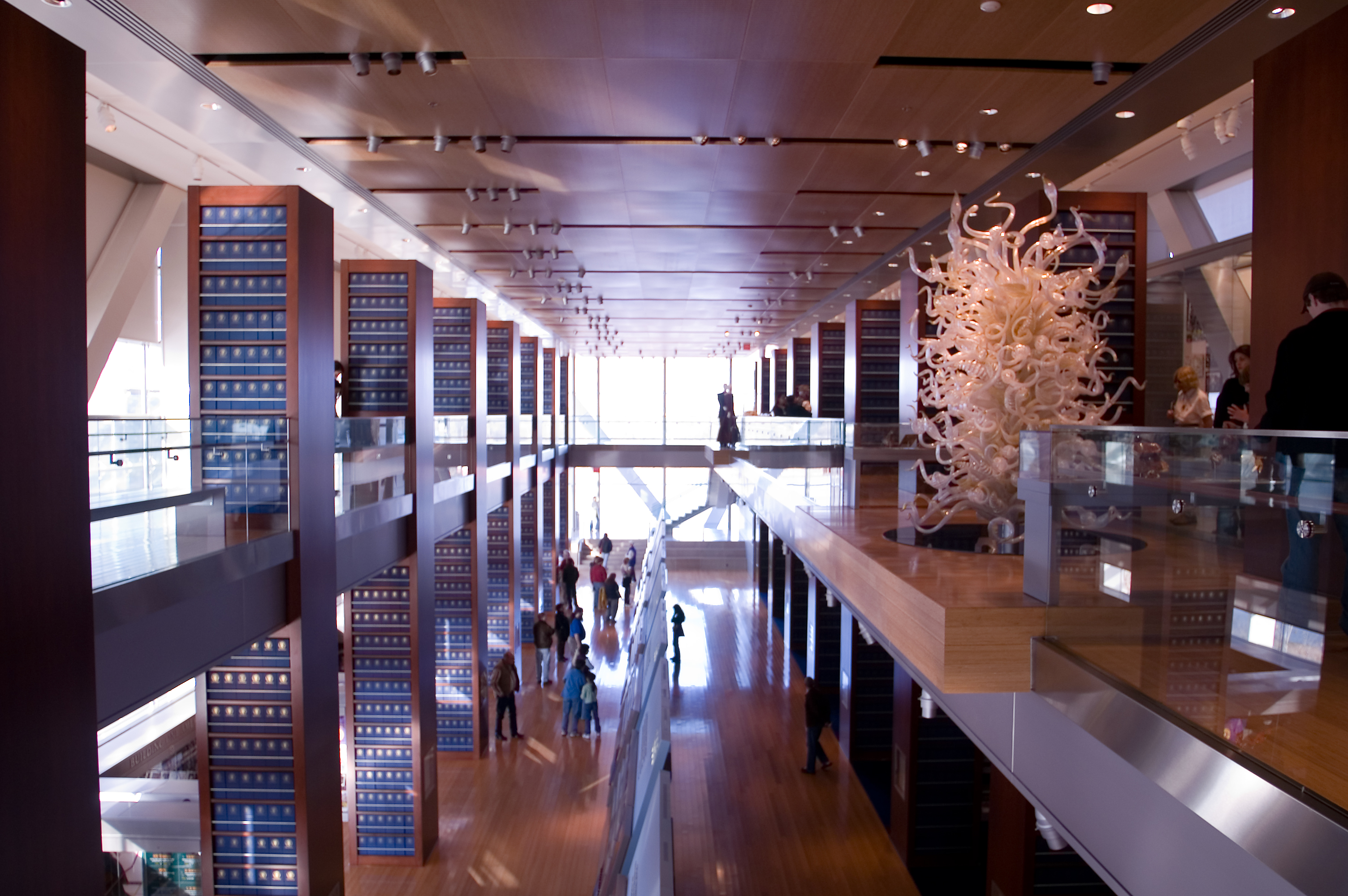
The main gallery, in the interior of the main building, is modeled after the Long Room of Trinity College, Dublin.

The five-story main building comprises 20,000 square feet (1,900 m^{2}) of exhibition space, the Great Hall (used for banquets or forums), Forty Two (formerly Café 42, now a full-service restaurant; Clinton was the 42nd president), and classrooms. A 2,000-square-foot (190 m^{2}) private penthouse used by Clinton is located on the top (fifth) floor of the main building, one level above the public museum area. In 2007 the Clinton Foundation installed on the rooftop of the Presidential library the private "Rooftop Garden" with a golf course.

The organization of the exhibits within the main building was inspired by the famous Long Room in the Old Library at Trinity College, Dublin, which Clinton first saw when he was a Rhodes Scholar. The Cadillac One used during Clinton's presidency is housed on the first floor. On the second floor, the main gallery houses a 110-foot (34 m) timeline, representing each of Clinton's years as president. There is also an 80-seat theater, the Great Hall, and the replicas of the Oval Office and Cabinet Room. The restaurant is located in the basement.

=== Archives ===
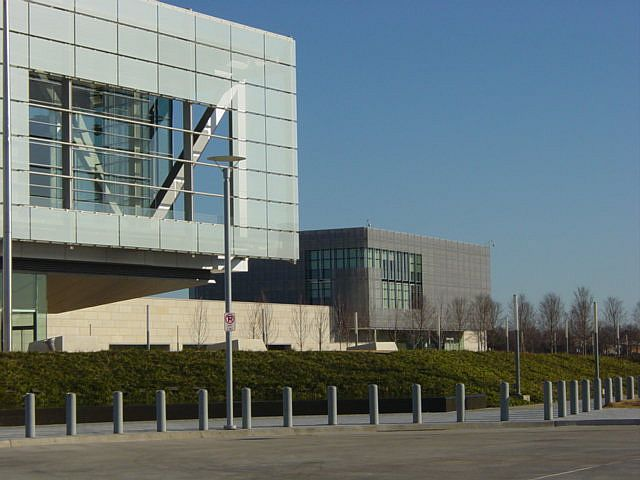
The archives building (in the background) contains by far the greatest amount of records for a president.

Between November 18, 2000 and January 27, 2001, eight Lockheed C-5 Galaxy missions moved 602 tonnes (664 short tons) of President Bill Clinton's papers, gifts, artifacts, and other official materials from Andrews Air Force Base to Little Rock Air Force Base. Commercial trucks transported the cargoes from the base to the National Archives storage facility in Little Rock, where they were to remain until completion of the Clinton presidential library in 2004.

The archives are housed in a building south of and connected to the main building, which also contains NARA facilities. The Clinton archives are the first to include electronic information along with physical documents. The total amount of records is 35,686 cubic feet (1,010.5 m^{3}), the most of any presidential archive. Because Clinton wanted a light-filled library, the archives are kept underground to protect them from damage from ultraviolet degradation.

=== Clinton Presidential Park ===
The Clinton Presidential Park occupies nearly 30 acres (120,000 m^{2}) of land and is located on the riverfront next to the museum. It is a leading example of urban renewal, as the site was formerly a run-down warehouse district. The park was built next to the site of abandoned railroad tracks of the defunct Chicago, Rock Island and Pacific Railroad. The center of the park is Celebration Circle, a fountain plaza around which the center's major buildings are located. It also includes an arboretum, amphitheater, gardens, and a children's play area. There is also an area where Clinton could be buried if he chooses.

=== Choctaw Station ===
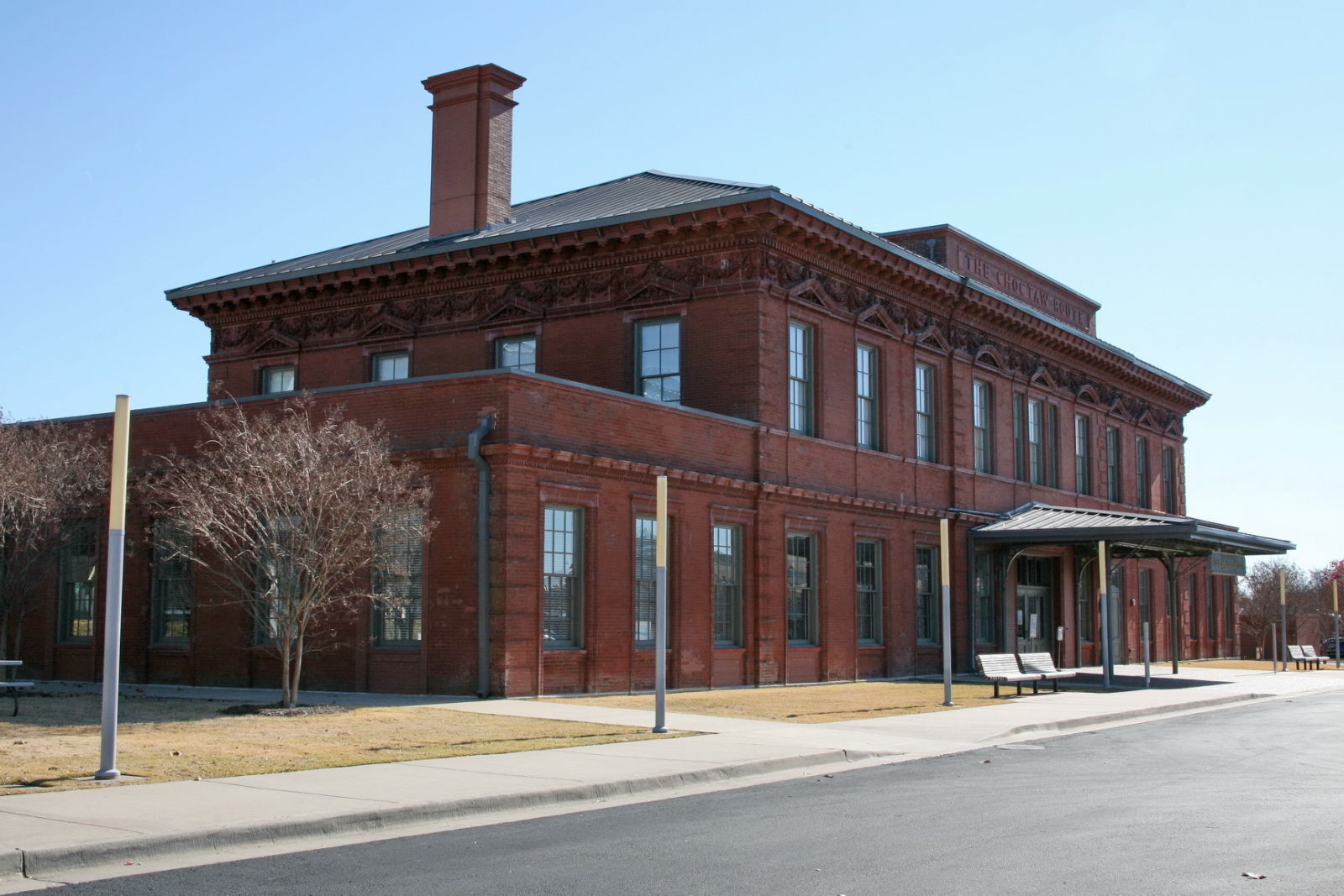
Choctaw Station, a restored train station

Choctaw Station is a restored historic redbrick train station opened by the Choctaw, Oklahoma and Gulf Railroad in 1901 and used by the Chicago, Rock Island & Pacific Railroad until passenger service was discontinued in November 1967. The building was subsequently purchased by the Arkansas Gazette (known now as Arkansas Democrat-Gazette) and later restored by a restaurant chain, Spaghetti Warehouse, which was known for preserving old buildings. The Choctaw Station now houses the University of Arkansas Clinton School of Public Service, the Clinton Public Policy Institute, and the Clinton Foundation. The station is 13,200 square feet (1,230 m^{2}) after having been renovated. A companion structure, the 1899 Choctaw freight station, was razed in November 2001 after a contentious debate between the City of Little Rock and historic preservationists.

=== Bridge ===
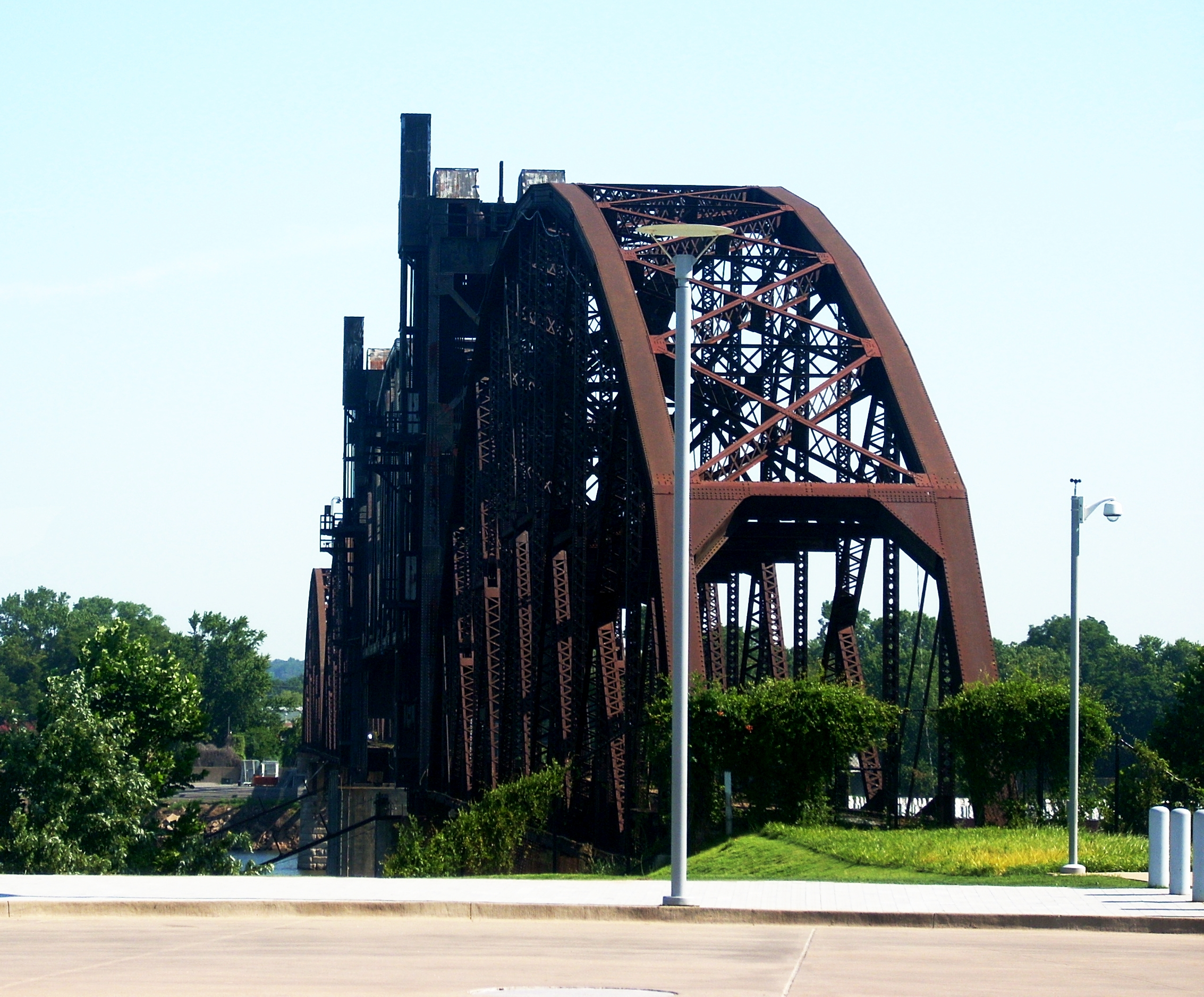
The Rock Island Railroad Bridge (before restoration) is a now-defunct railroad bridge.

The 1899 Rock Island Railroad Bridge across the Arkansas River, originally built by the Choctaw and Memphis Railroad and leading to Choctaw Station, has been converted into a pedestrian bridge connecting to North Little Rock. On the fifth anniversary of the library's opening, Clinton said that construction on the project would begin in 2010, but full funding had not yet been secured, as the project was still short about $3 million. The Clinton Foundation had originally planned to renovate the bridge for $4 million in exchange for a $1-a-year land lease from the state. In 2009, Arkansas Governor Mike Beebe agreed to use $2.5 million of stimulus funds to fund part of the renovation. A previous $8 million earmark for the project had failed to pass the state legislature. In 2010, fundraising was finally completed for the bridge, renamed as the Clinton Park Bridge, and construction began on May 28, 2010. On September 30, 2011, Clinton spoke at a dedication ceremony for the bridge, which opened to the public on October 2, 2011.

=== Store ===
For legal reasons involving state development funds, retail facilities were, for a time, prohibited on the same property as the library itself. The Clinton Museum Store was first located in the nearby River Market district. In 2016, however, the limitation expired and the store relocated to the library lobby.

== Exhibits ==
Hillary — Happy Valentine's Day! I love you, Bill.

— Bill Clinton, Valentine's Day note to Hillary Clinton.

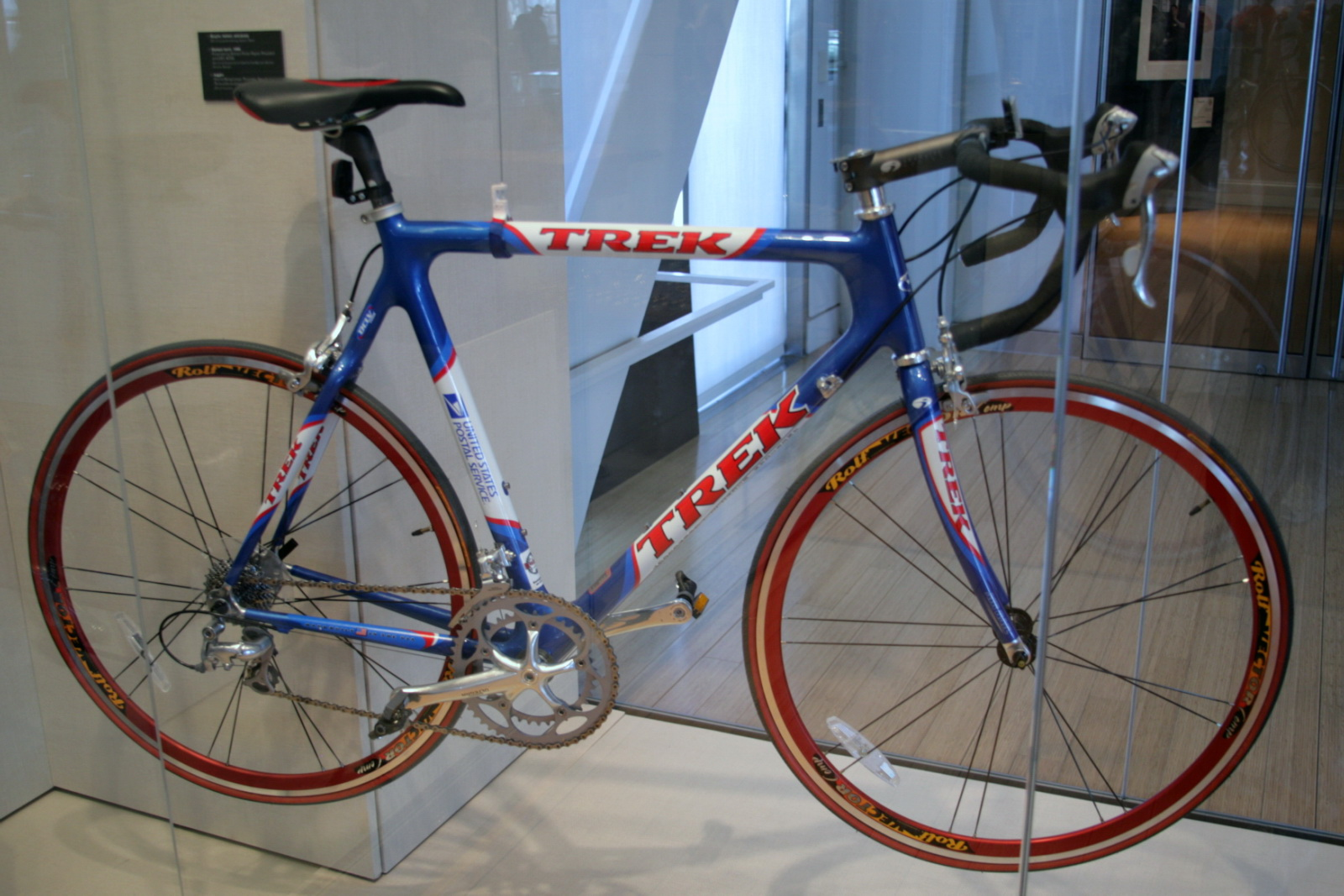
One exhibit at the library features a bike given to Clinton by Lance Armstrong

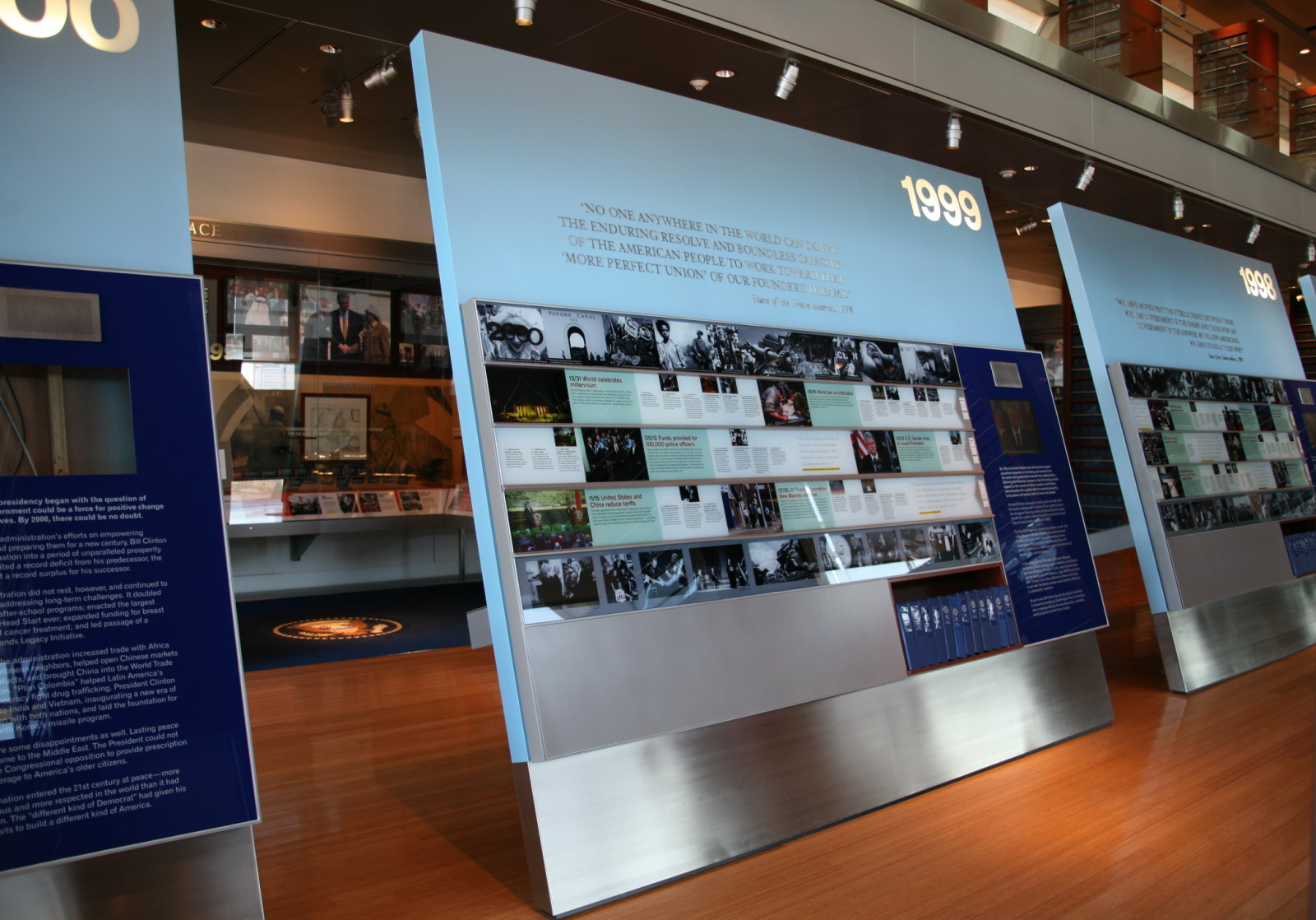
The lower area of the main gallery houses a timeline

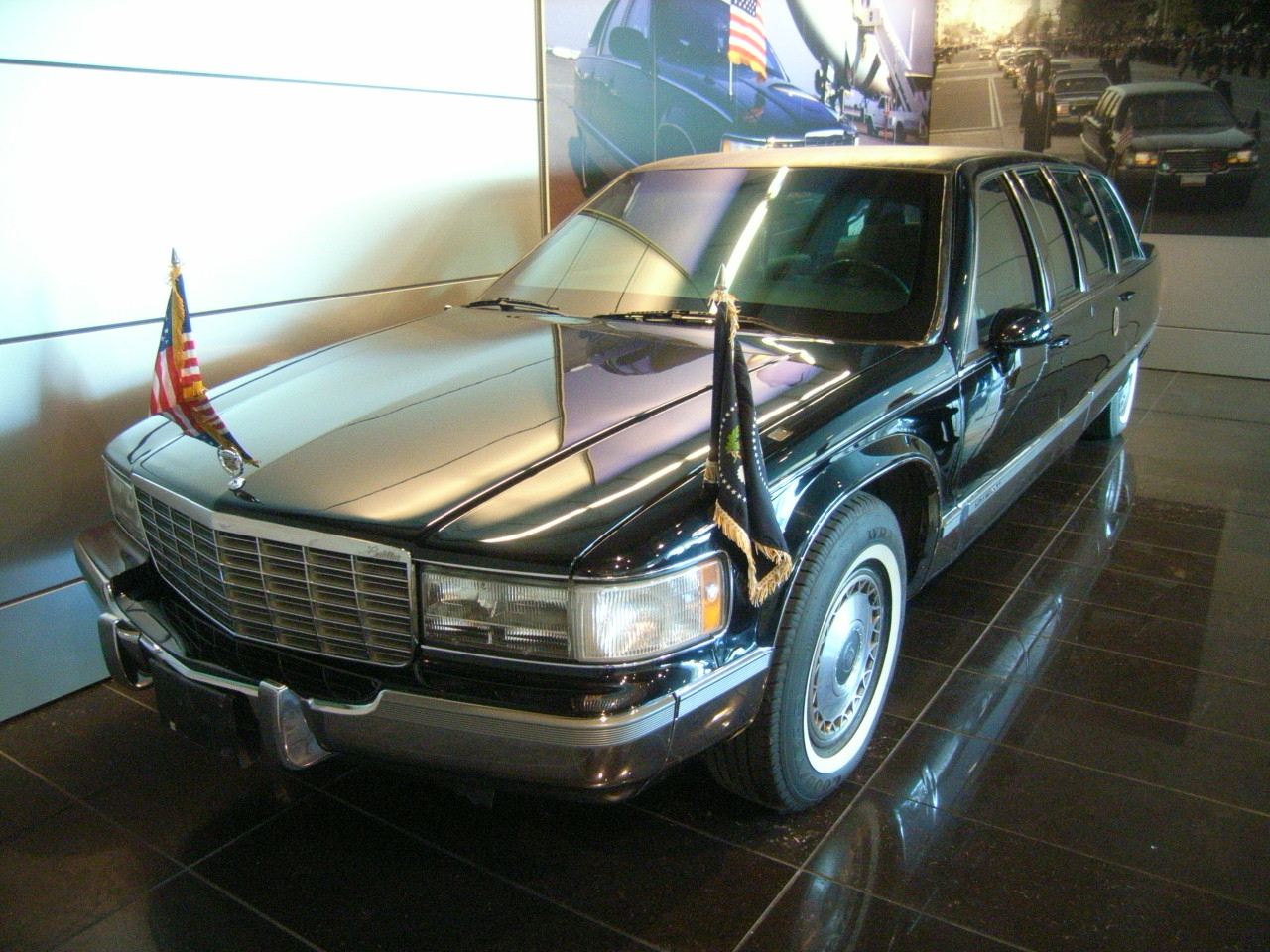
Bill Clinton's presidential limousine on display at the library

The Clinton Library features numerous items from Clinton's time as president. Clinton's Cadillac One is on the first floor of the main building. The second floor includes the main gallery. It consists of a 110-foot (34 m) timeline of each of Clinton's years as president, as well as 14 alcoves featuring various events during Clinton's terms. There is an orientation theater and full-size replicas of the Clinton-era Oval Office and Cabinet Room as well. The Oval Office exhibit is the only full-size model Oval Office in any presidential library, and was constructed using thousands of photos taken by White House officials of the original office.

The timeline comprises eight panels, each one 18 feet (5.5 m) wide and begins with Clinton's 1993 inaugural address. Items on the alcove displays include the Oklahoma City bombing and Northern Ireland and Middle East peace efforts. Items released by the Presidential Records Act of 1978 are included in the exhibits, including personal letters written to and by the Clinton family, such as ones from Whoopi Goldberg and Arsenio Hall, as well as family photographs and even a Valentine's Day note from Bill Clinton to Hillary. The second floor of the main gallery showcases artifacts from previous state dinners and various state gifts, such as ceramics and other decorative pieces. An exhibit on Clinton's saxophone and another on family pets Socks and Buddy are also on the second floor.

Clinton has been criticized for not including enough details about the Monica Lewinsky scandal and his impeachment. One of the 14 alcoves is dedicated to the "politics of persecution" and is titled The Fight For Power. The alcove includes the Lewinsky affair, the Whitewater scandal, and the Republican Contract with America. Ralph Applebaum, the chief exhibit designer for the center, said that Clinton was heavily involved in the alcove's design, and that Clinton "insisted on a transparent and illuminating exhibition". The scandal is portrayed as a power struggle between Republicans in Congress and Clinton after the Republican Party took control of both the House of Representatives and Senate in 1994.

== Controversies and criticism ==
In 1997, Eugene Pfeifer III sued the city of Little Rock to challenge its use of eminent domain in the use of the land but the city's method of taking the land was upheld by the Arkansas Supreme Court in 2001. Pfeifer argued against the use of revenue bonds for the project because he believed that the city could not afford to repay them. In 2001, a rail depot dating from 1899 was discovered within a warehouse on the site. Preservationists lost a court battle to save the building, and the depot was destroyed. Protesters also picketed the city hall when the city tried to name the street in front of the library "President Clinton Avenue". The two groups later compromised and only half of the street was renamed.

The library has been criticized for not including much information about the pardons Clinton issued just before leaving office. On January 20, 2001, his last day in office, Clinton pardoned former financier Marc Rich, a fugitive who had been charged with multiple counts of racketeering, wire fraud, income tax evasion, and illegal oil trading. Rich's wife, Denise Eisenberg Rich, was reported to have made three donations totaling nearly $1,000,000 to Clinton's presidential library fund, as well as multiple other contributions to the Democratic Party and Hillary Clinton's senate campaign. It was later found that she only made three payments totaling $450,000 to the fundraiser. The Senate Judiciary Committee was investigating the pardon and issued subpoenas for Denise Rich's bank records because she refused to testify before the House Government Reform Committee, in accordance with her Fifth Amendment right against self-incrimination. U.S. Attorney Mary Jo White also launched a criminal investigation into whether the pardon had been a result of the contributions. It was later claimed that Rich had donated the funds months before asking for a pardon. Clinton maintained that the pardon had not been bought, but had been based instead on the legal merits of Marc Rich's appeal. During the 2008 U.S. presidential election, Barack Obama referenced the donations during his primary campaign against Hillary Rodham Clinton.

Clinton has also been criticized for the library's lack of coverage regarding various scandals during his presidency, including the Whitewater scandal. Clinton adviser Bruce Lindsey said that Clinton wanted to provide information regarding the incidents, but depicting the attacks as a scheme to "delegitimize" Clinton's administration. The museum's main exhibit designer has said that "this is the way the president wanted to see his legacy defined."

== Design ==
=== General design ===
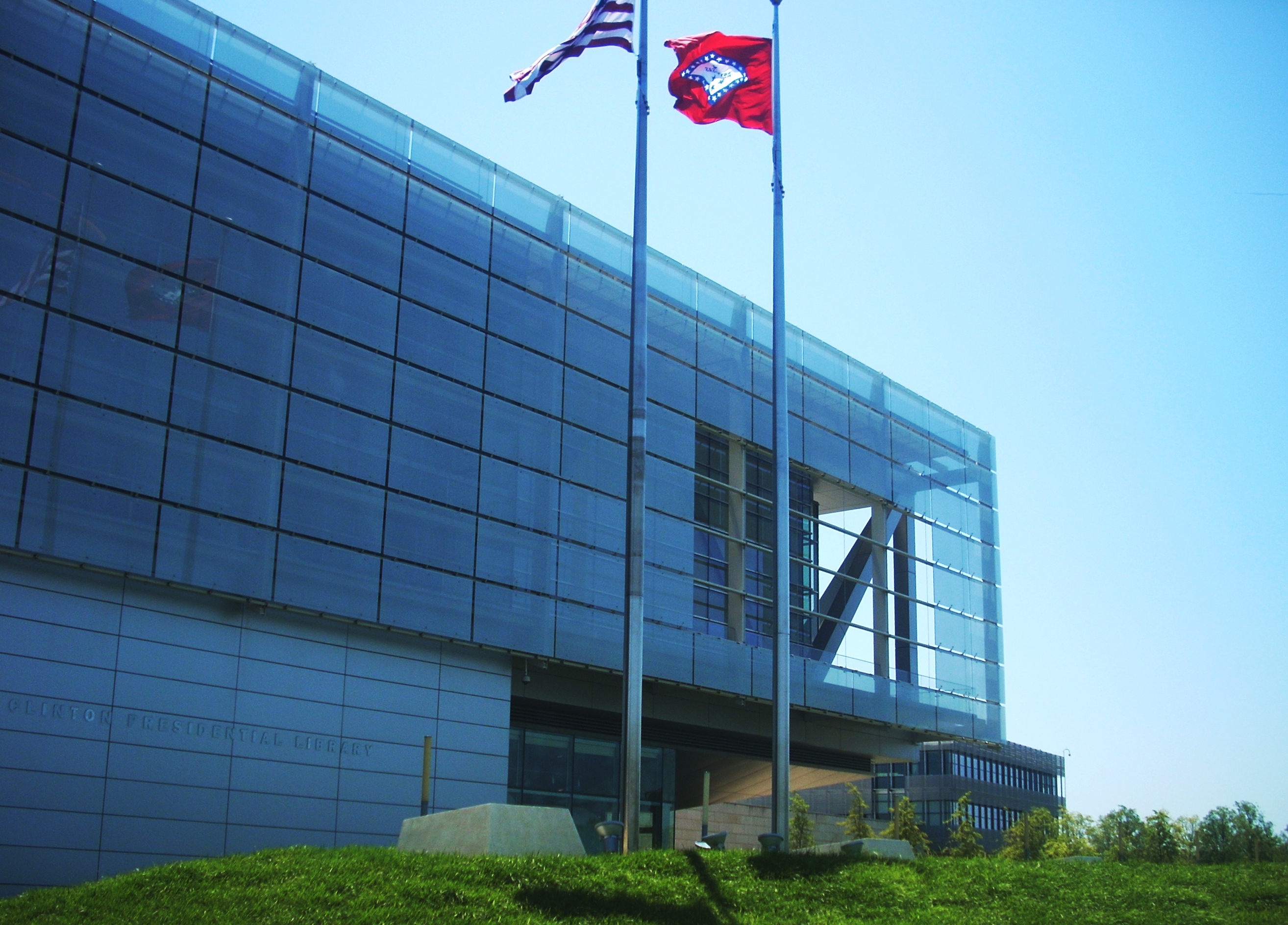
The glass screen, which acts as a sunscreen, is on the main building's western face.

The primarily modernist complex was designed by James Polshek's Polshek Partnership Architects, led by Polshek and partner Richard Olcott. The structural engineer for this project was Leslie E. Robertson Associates. The museum and exhibitions were designed by Ralph Appelbaum Associates, with landscaping by Hargreaves associates. Clinton did not announce his choice of architect until 1999, when Polshek was officially hired that August. Although Appelbaum was the official designer for the exhibitions, Appelbaum called Clinton "the editor-in-chief, the curator-in-chief and in many times the art director of the exhibits".

It is constructed primarily of steel and glass. The main building is based on the diagonal truss. Originally, the museum was planned parallel to the river, but was quickly changed so it would lie perpendicular to the river, for the purpose of providing a better view to visitors. The western façade of the museum is a screen wall composed of laminated glass tiles, providing a sunscreen for the building. The underside is constructed of aluminum. Some critics dislike the bridge design, saying it looks too much like a trailer on stilts.

=== Environment ===
The library incorporates many aspects of environmentally-sensitive design, in accordance to Clinton's work involving sustainable development. It first earned a Silver Leadership in Energy and Environmental Design (LEED) certification under the United States Green Building Council LEED for New Construction program in 2004 and later Platinum Certification under LEED-EB (LEED for Existing Buildings) in 2007. The library's flooring is made of recycled rubber tires and there are charging stations for electric vehicles in the parking lot. In 2007, a rooftop garden was established atop the library, in addition to existing solar panels. The garden collects runoff and is maintained without the use of gasoline-powered lawn mowers and chemical pesticides or fertilizers.

== Economic impact ==
After the location for the project was announced, many new businesses began to develop in the surrounding area. Numerous hotels, restaurants, housing complexes, offices, retail stores were established. The revived River Market district, a dining and retail area near the library, was created as a result of its location. In addition, over $1 billion of new real estate has been invested in downtown Little Rock. The world headquarters of Heifer International is located just beyond the library.

The center has spurred an estimated $2 billion in new projects in the surrounding parts of Little Rock. Since its opening, the library has had over 1.64 million visitors. The museum had 302,583 visitors in 2009 and 273,108 visitors in 2008. There were approximately 500,000 visitors during its first year (November 2004 – 2005).

=== Student outreach ===
The Clinton Presidential Center offers free admission to school groups, homeschool groups, and other school personnel with a reservation.

The center also offers four free-admission days annually in celebration of Presidents' Day, the Fourth of July, President Clinton's birthday, and the anniversary of the Clinton Center's grand opening.

== See also ==
- Presidential Records Act
- Presidential memorials in the United States
