= Ennead Architects =

Architectural firm based in New York City

Ennead, a CannonDesign Company
- Type: Private
- Industry: Architecture
- Predecessor: New York City, U.S. ("Ennead, a CannonDesign Company", 2026; "Ennead Architects", 2010-present; "Polshek Partnership", 1998-2010; "Polshek and Partners", 1994-1998; "James Stewart Polshek and Partners", 1980-1994; "James Stewart Polshek and Associates", 1970-1980; "James Stewart Polshek, Architect", 1963-1970)
- Founder: Joseph Fleischer, Timothy Hartung, Duncan Hazard, Guy Maxwell, Kevin McClurkan, Richard Olcott, Susan Rodriguez, Tomas Rossant, Todd Schliemann, Don Weinreich, Thomas Wong
- Headquarters: New York City, U.S.
- Services: Architecture; Master Planning; Historic Preservation; Interior Design
- Number of employees: 160
- Website: http://www.ennead.com/

Ennead, a CannonDesign Company, (/ˈenēˌad/) is a New York City-based architectural firm. The firm was founded in 1963 by James Polshek, who left the firm in 2005 when it was known as Polshek Partnership. The firm's partners renamed their practice in mid-2010.

== Project examples ==
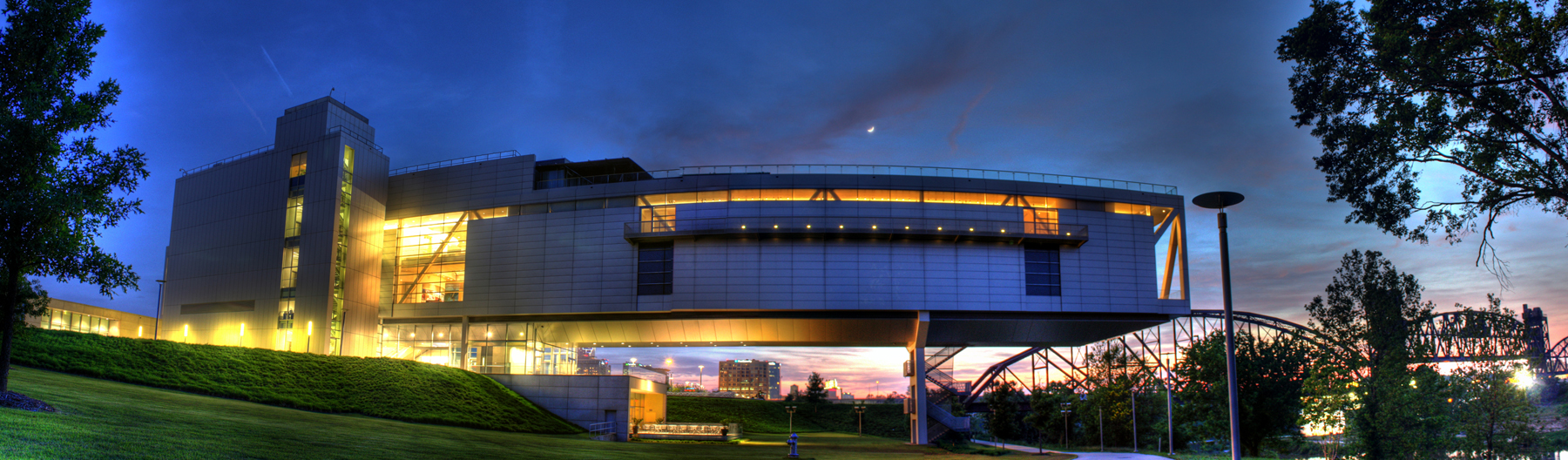
William Jefferson Clinton Presidential Center

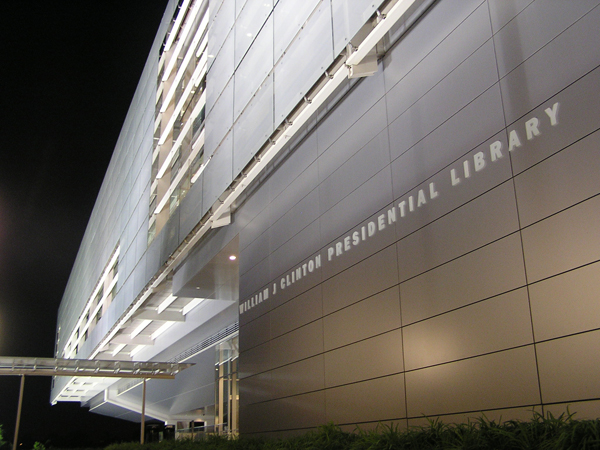
William Jefferson Clinton Presidential Center

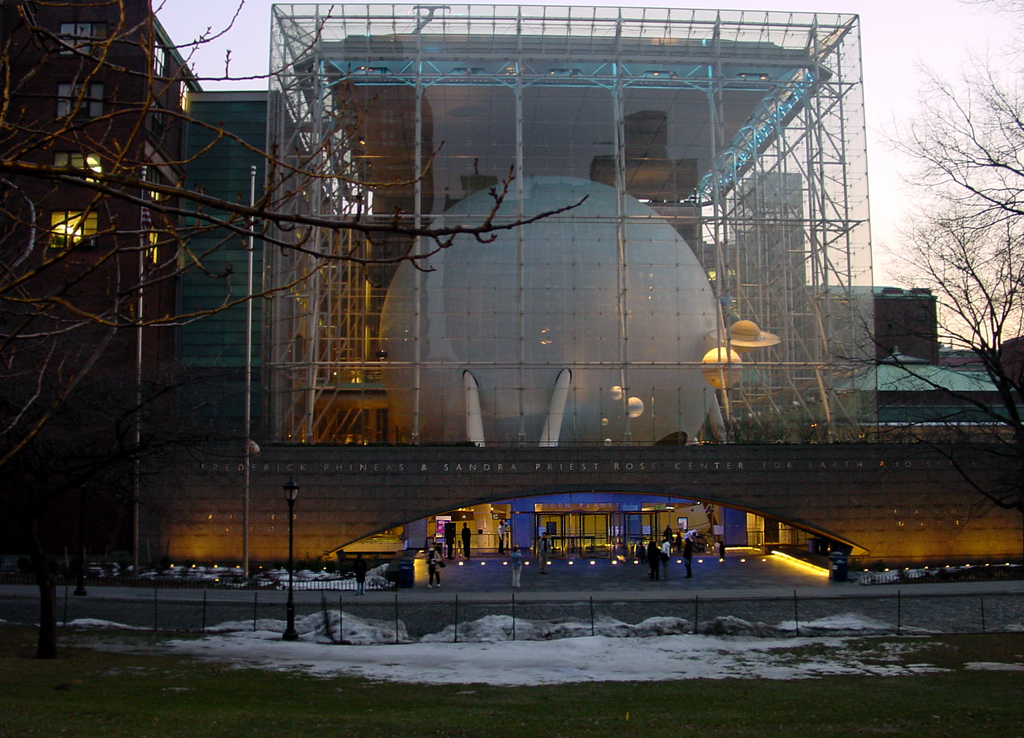
Rose Center for Earth and Space, New York

- Jean & Ric Edelman Fossil Park & Museum, Rowan University, Mantua Township, New Jersey (2025)
- Johns Hopkins University, Bloomberg Center, Washington D.C. (2023)
- Shanghai Planetarium, Shanghai, China (2020)
- University of Michigan, Biological Science Building, Ann Arbor, MI (2019)
- Peabody Essex Museum Expansion and Renovation, Salem, MA (2019)
- Anderson Collection at Stanford University, Stanford, CA (2014)
- National Museum of American Jewish History, Philadelphia, PA (2010)
- Brooklyn Museum, Elizabeth A. Sackler Center for Feminist Art, Brooklyn, NY (2007)
- Carnegie Hall, Zankel Hall, New York, NY (2003)
- The University of Texas at Austin, McCombs School of Business, Robert B. Rowling Hall, Austin, TX (2018)

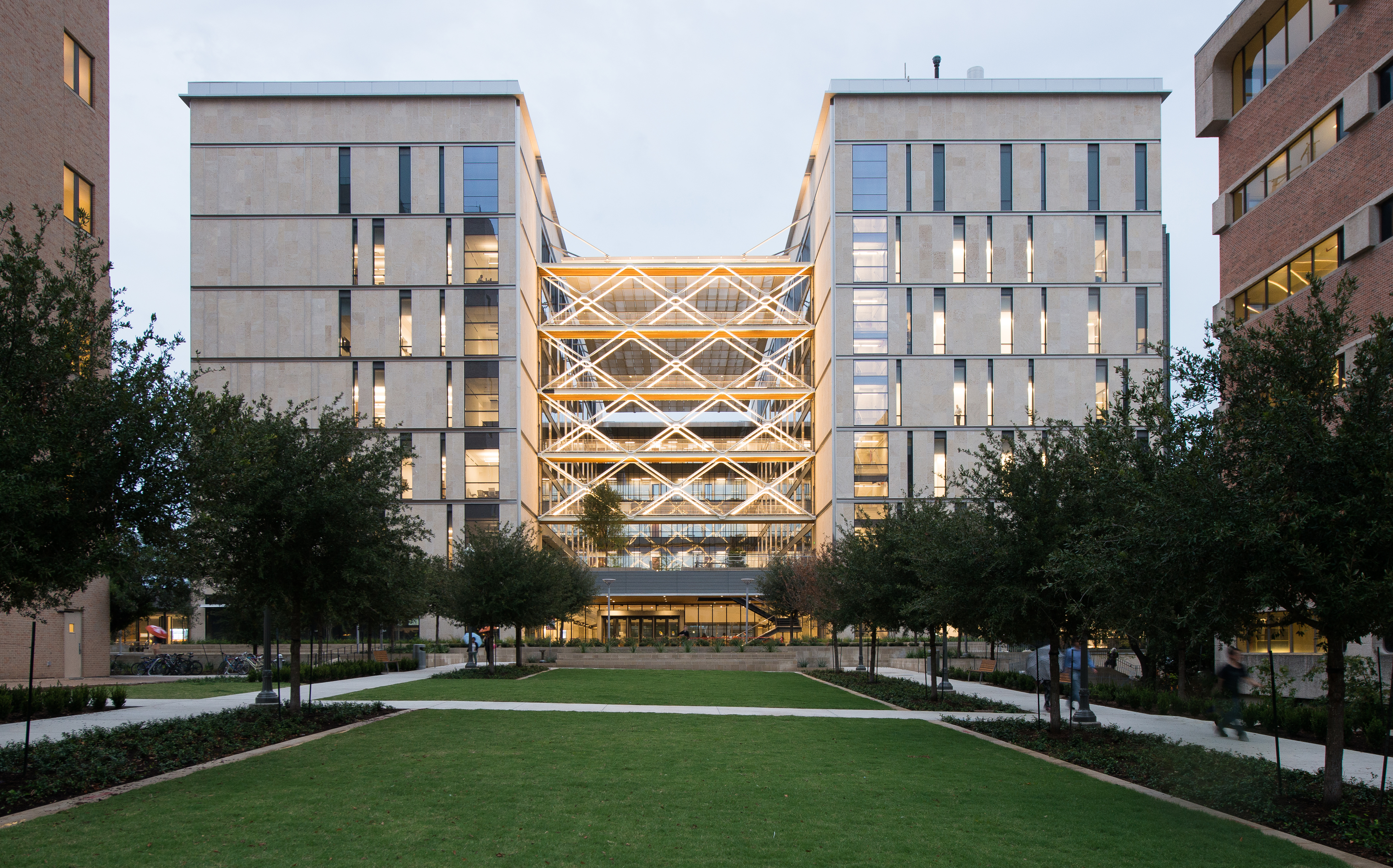
UT at Austin EER

- United States Embassy, Ankara, Turkey (2023)
- Kansas State University, College of Architecture, Planning and Design, Manhattan, KS (2017)
- Massachusetts College of Art and Design, Design and Media Center, Boston, MA (2016)
- Syracuse University, S.I. Newhouse School of Public Communications, Syracuse, NY (2007)
- Stanford University, ChEM-H (Chemistry, Engineering & Medicine for Human Health) and the Wu Tsai Neurosciences Institute, Stanford, CA (2020)
- University of Oregon, Knight Campus for Accelerating Scientific Impact, Eugene, OR (2020)
