= James Polshek =

American architect (1930–2022)

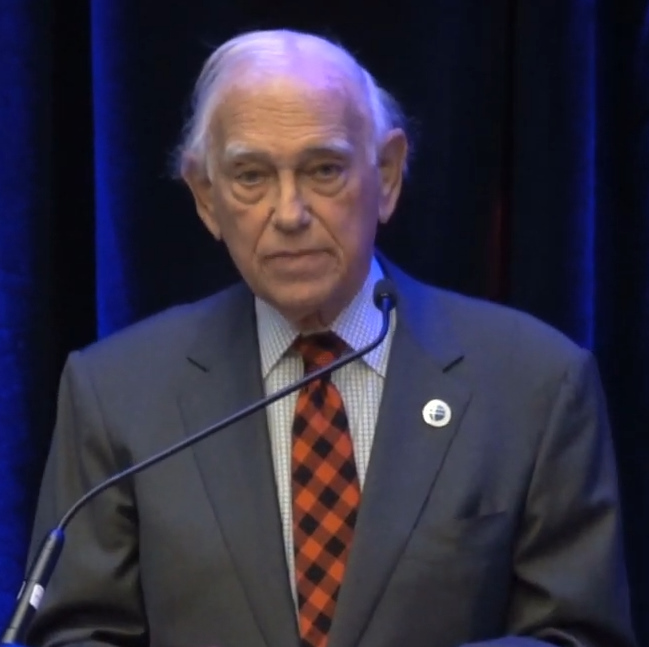
- Polshek in October 2019
- Born: James Stewart Polshek; February 11, 1930; Akron, Ohio, U.S.
- Died: September 9, 2022 (aged 92); Manhattan, New York City, U.S.
- Occupation: Architect
- Spouse: Ellyn Margolis (m. 1952)
- Children: 2
- Awards: AIA Medal of Honor (1986); AIA Architecture Firm Award (1992)
- Practice: Polshek Partnership, now Ennead Architects
- Buildings: William Jefferson Clinton Presidential Center, Rose Center for Earth and Space, Newseum

James Stewart Polshek (February 11, 1930 – September 9, 2022) was an American architect based in New York City. He was the founder of Polshek Partnership, the firm at which he was the principal design partner for more than four decades. He worked as design counsel to the legacy firm Ennead Architects, as well as being actively engaged as design lead on multiple projects.

== Early life ==
Polshek was born in Akron, Ohio, on February 11, 1930. His father, Max, was the owner of an army-navy store; his mother, Pearl (Beyer), was a housewife. Polshek initially intended to study medicine, enrolling in premed at Case Western Reserve University's Adelbert College in 1947. He began taking a variety of courses, including a course on the history of modern architecture. After deciding to study architecture, he transferred to Yale University in 1950 and studied under Louis Kahn, graduating five years later with a Master of Architecture degree. He was also a Fulbright/Hayes fellow in Copenhagen, and received several grants from the Graham Foundation. After Polshek became dean of Columbia University's Graduate School of Architecture, Planning, and Preservation in 1973, Western Reserve University granted his Bachelor of Science degree in 1973, forgiving the eight credits he was short.

== Professional career ==
Polshek first worked for I. M. Pei, Ulrich Franzen, and other architects, before establishing his firm – James Stewart Polshek Architect – in 1963. Some of the first projects he worked on were two research facilities in Japan, as well as collaborating with Walfredo Toscanini to design a Midtown Manhattan community center. The majority of his firm's projects were in the United States, with many in New York City. These included the Ed Sullivan Theater, Seamen's Church Institute at the South Street Seaport, Sulzberger Hall at Barnard College, the Skirball Institute of Biomolecular Medicine and Residence Tower at New York University, and the refurbishment of Carnegie Hall. Polshek became the dean of the Graduate School of Architecture, Planning, and Preservation at Columbia University in 1973, serving in that capacity until 1987. Under his leadership, the curriculum was revised and extended to encompass urban planning, real estate, and historic preservation. Polshek was unusual among top-tier architects for taking the position that architecture is more craft than fine art and that architects have some measure of social responsibility.

In 2003, Polshek served as an architectural adviser to the selection committee that chose SANAA as architects for the New Museum building.

After retiring from his firm's partnership in 2005, Polshek maintained the title of design counsel to Ennead Architects (the new name of that firm). He served as the architect commissioner on the NYC Design Commission during the mid-2010s. His book, Build, Memory, was published in April 2014 by Monacelli Press.

== Personal life ==
Polshek married Ellyn Margolis in 1952. Together, they had two children: Peter and Jennifer. He maintained an apartment in Paris during his later years.

Polshek died on September 9, 2022, at his home in Manhattan. He was 92 and suffered from kidney disease before his death.

== Awards and honors ==
Polshek was a Fellow of the American Institute of Architects (FAIA), and the 2018 recipient of the organization's highest honor, the AIA Gold Medal. He earlier received the Gold Medal award from the New York City chapter of the American Institute of Architects (AIA) in 1986. In 2002, he was honored with the Municipal Art Society's Jacqueline Kennedy Onassis Medal, and was inducted into the American Academy of Arts and Sciences. Three years later, he was elected to the American Academy of Arts and Letters.

Polshek received honorary degrees from Pratt Institute (1995), the New School University Parsons School of Design (1999), the New Jersey Institute of Technology (2002), and Columbia University (2022).
