= Gundersen (surname) =

Gundersen is a surname of Danish and Norwegian origin. Notable people with the surname include:

- Arnold Gundersen, (born 1949), American nuclear engineer and whistleblower
- Bjørn Gundersen (1924–2002), Norwegian high jumper
- Dag Gundersen (1928–2016), Norwegian linguist and lexicographer
- Einar 'Jeja' Gundersen (1896–1962), Norwegian footballer
- Erik Gundersen (born 1959), Danish speedway rider
- Fridtjof Frank Gundersen (1934–2011), Norwegian law professor and politician for the Progress Party
- Gunder Gundersen (1930–2005), Norwegian Nordic combined skier and sports official
- Gunnar Gundersen (politician) (born 1956), Norwegian politician and Olympic swimmer
- Gunnar Bull Gundersen (1929–1993), Norwegian writer
- Gunnar S. Gundersen (1921–1983), Norwegian modernist painter
- Hans Jørgen G. Gundersen, Danish stereology researcher
- Henry Gundersen, (1920–1945) Norwegian resistance member
- Jacob Gundersen, Norwegian Olympic wrestler
- Jostein Gundersen (born 1996), Norwegian footballer
- Lauren Gunderson (born 1982), American playwright, screenwriter, and short story author
- Mia Gundersen (born 1961), Norwegian singer and actress
- Noah Gundersen (born 1989), singer/songwriter
- Oscar Christian Gundersen (1908–1991), Norwegian politician for the Labour Party, twice Minister for Justice
- Rudolf Gundersen (1879–1946), Norwegian speed skater
- Trude Gundersen (born 1977), Norwegian Olympic medalist in taekwondo
