= Florence Merriam Bailey =

American ornithologist (1863–1948)

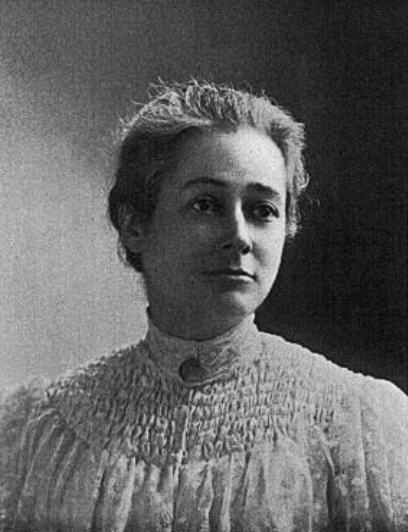
- Merriam in 1904
- Born: Florence Augusta Merriam; August 8, 1863; Locust Grove, New York, U.S.
- Died: September 22, 1948 (aged 85); Washington, D.C., U.S.
- Resting place: Locust Grove, New York
- Education: Smith College (1882–1886); Stanford University
- Known for: First modern field guide for birdwatchers, regional ornithology, bird conservation
- Spouse: Vernon Orlando Bailey (m. 1899; died 1942)
- Relatives: Clinton Hart Merriam (brother)
- Awards: Brewster Medal
- Scientific career
- Fields: Ornithology

Florence Augusta Merriam Bailey (August 8, 1863 – September 22, 1948) was an American ornithologist, birdwatcher, and nature writer. Between 1890 and 1939, she published a series of field guides on North American bird life. These guides were often written with amateur birdwatchers in mind, leading to the popularity of the birding movement.

With little formal education as a child, Merriam developed an interest in the natural sciences from her explorations of the Adirondack Mountains, near where she grew up, and the scientific interests of her family members, including her older brother Clinton Hart Merriam. Her nature writing and activism started at Smith College in 1882, where she was enrolled as a special student. She was later awarded a degree at age 58, due to her subsequent activism and writing. While there, she and Fannie Hardy Eckstorm created a chapter of the Audubon Society to educate their classmates on ornithology and dissuade them from wearing hats with feathers. By the time Merriam left Smith in 1886, one-third of the student body was involved in the Society.

In 1889, Merriam turned a series of bird profiles that she had published in Bird-Lore into a book, Birds Through an Opera-Glass. Unlike other ornithological works, which studied trapped birds in indoor settings, Merriam's writing encouraged the natural, outdoor study of live birds. Her later works, such as Birds of Village and Field, were more technical than her early writings, but they retained their focus on ecology. In 1899, Merriam married Vernon Orlando Bailey, a member of the U.S. Biological Survey. Between 1902 and 1919, she wrote over 50 articles for periodicals like The Condor based on her observations. Her magnum opus was Birds of New Mexico, which she completed at the request of the U.S. Biological Survey after Wells Cooke's death. Originally, she and Cooke were listed as co-authors, but Merriam successfully petitioned the Survey to name her the sole author due to the magnitude of her contributions.

Merriam and her husband lived in Washington, D.C., where she taught birdwatching classes at the National Zoological Park. She was both the first woman elected as a Fellow of the American Ornithologists' Union and the first woman awarded the Brewster Medal. After her husband's death in 1942, Merriam mostly retreated from public life until her death at age 85. Parus gambeli baileyae, a subspecies of mountain chickadee, is named in her honor.

== Early life and education ==
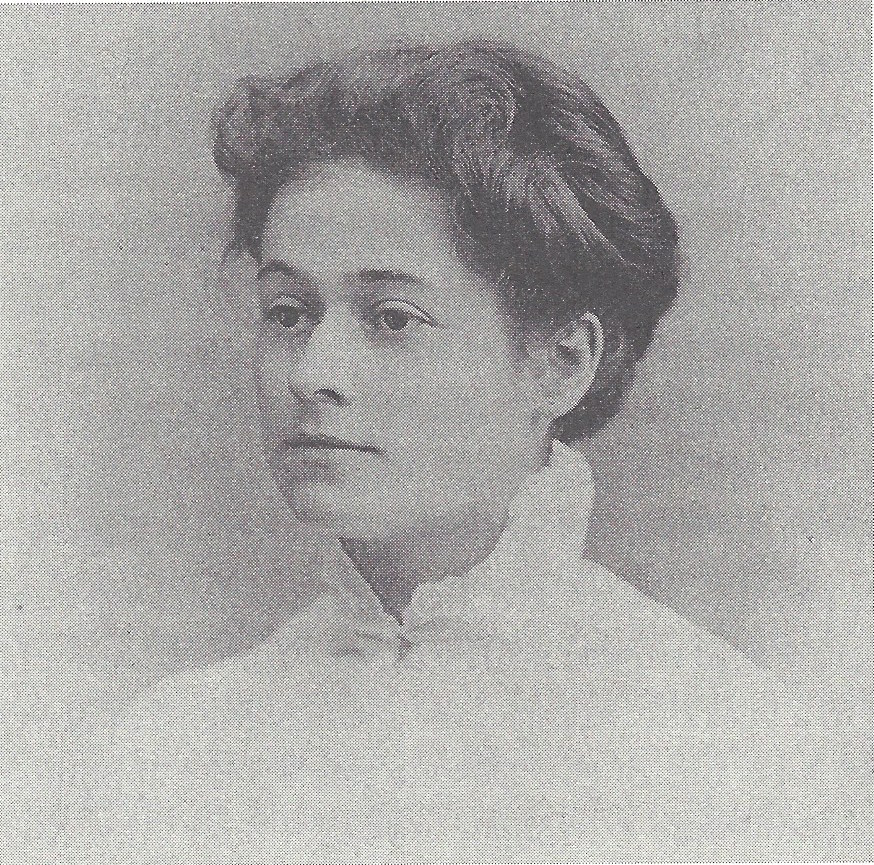
Bailey's 1886 yearbook photo from her time at Smith College.

Florence Augusta Merriam was born on August 8, 1863, in Locust Grove, New York, the youngest of four children born to Clinton Levi and Caroline (née Hart) Merriam. Her father had been a merchant and banker in Utica and New York City before settling in Locust Grove, shortly before his daughter was born. Between 1871 and 1875, Clinton Merriam served as the United States Congressman from Lewis County, New York, as a member of the Republican Party. Caroline Merriam, meanwhile, was a graduate of Rutgers Female College and the daughter of Levi Hart, a county court judge and New York State Assembly member from Collinsville.

Many members of the Merriam family took an interest in the natural sciences. While at Rutgers, Caroline had developed an interest in astronomy, which she shared with her husband and children by allowing them to look at constellations and eclipses through a telescope. Merriam once referred to her paternal aunt, Helen Bagg, as "our family botanist". Her father, meanwhile, developed an interest in nature when, in 1870, he traveled to California on the first transcontinental railroad. Clinton was interested in glaciation as it related to his travels in the Yosemite Valley, and he engaged in a lengthy written correspondence with the naturalist John Muir over this topic.

The Merriam family estate, named Homewood, was situated near the Adirondack Mountains, with ample opportunities to explore local wildlife. Merriam would take walks around the estate with her father and older brother, developing her knowledge of the region's species. Her primary interest was in birds, whose habits, songs, and species she learned to identify by watching them from her dining room window. When she was nine years old, Merriam accompanied her father and her older brother, Clinton Hart Merriam, on their camping trip to Florida. C. Hart, as he was known in his adult life, was also interested in the natural sciences, spending his adolescence studying birds and performing taxidermy on the animals he trapped on the family property. Their father's time in Congress gave them connections to the naturalist scene in Washington, D.C.: the elder Merriam arranged a meeting with Spencer Fullerton Baird, then the assistant secretary of the Smithsonian Institution, to employ C. Hart as an ornithologist on a Yellowstone expedition in 1872.

As a child, Merriam was primarily educated at home, which she described as based in the scientific and natural interests of her family members. Her first formal education took place in Syracuse, New York, where Merriam was sent for medical treatment due to general ill health. She lived with her physician's family for a year and attended the local public school there. After that experience, Merriam attended school in New York City, where her family spent the winters, and at Mrs. Piatt's private school in Utica.

== College and early activism ==
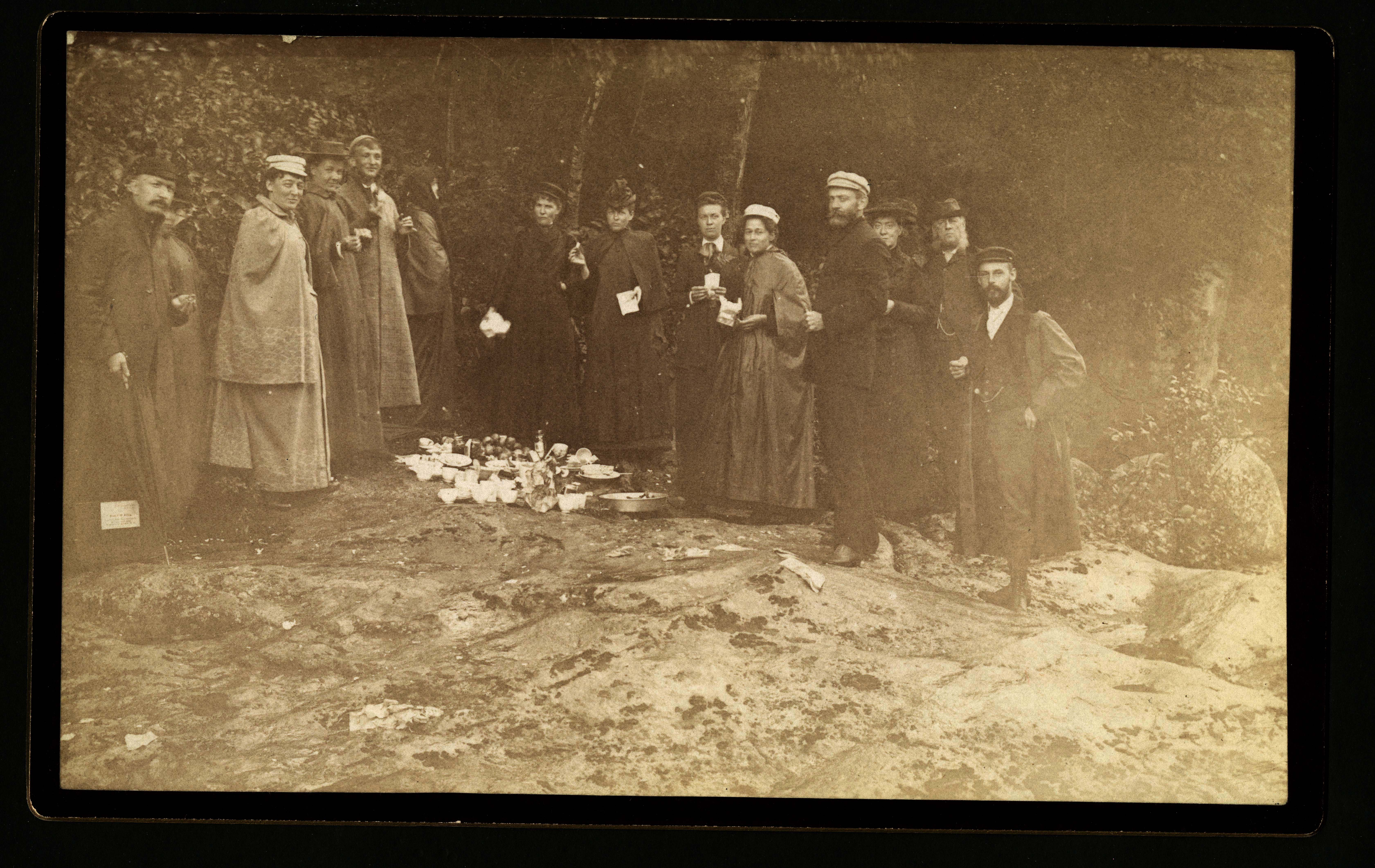
Bailey and several other individuals gathered at Lake Placid, New York

At the insistence of her older brothers, Merriam enrolled in 1882 at the newly-founded Smith College in Northampton, Massachusetts. The poor health that had beleaguered her throughout her childhood and prevented her from much formal education meant that she could only enroll as a special student. This prevented her from the advanced study of liberal arts, but also allowed her to take courses in which she was personally interested rather than following a prescribed course of study. At the time of her enrollment, Smith lacked a science course, and so most of her class work was in writing, literature, geology, ethics, comparative religions, philosophy, music, and art. By the end of her college tenure, however, she had concentrated in science and wrote a senior thesis on evolution.

By September 1885, as she entered her final year at Smith, Merriam had an obsession with birds that began at the encouragement of family friend Ernest Thompson Seton. C. Hart, who at that time had become the chief of the U.S. Biological Survey and one of the founders of the American Ornithologists' Union, nominated her as the first female associate of the Union. The following January, Merriam, who had befriended Fannie Hardy Eckstorm, was aghast to find that her friend wore bird feathers in her hat. As more of their classmates took up the practice, Merriam began advocating both on and off campus for the protection of birds and alterations to the millinery industry. In 1886, Merriam published a series of newspaper articles in New York, New Hampshire, and Washington, D.C., arguing for an end to bird feather hat decorations.

On February 11, 1886, the naturalist George Bird Grinnell wrote an editorial proposing the formation of an Audubon Society for the protection of wild birds. One month after Grinnell made this call, Merriam and Hardy, who by this point had stopped wearing feathered hats, created one of the first local chapters of the Audubon Society at Smith College. About 75 students and faculty members attended the first meeting of the organization, and by March 17, 1886, the Smith College Audubon Society had adopted a constitution, officers, and a field committee. That year, Merriam published an article in Audubon Magazine about the aims of the club, which encouraged field study by asking students to observe "how the birds look, what they have to say, how they spend their time, what sort of houses they build, and what are their family secrets".

Merriam was of the belief that rather than outright telling her classmates to stop wearing feathered hats, it was more effective to take them on nature walks, which would cause them to form an attachment to local wildlife and stop the practice of their own accord. As part of this process, she recruited John Burroughs to come to campus and take the students on a nature walk. Shortly after Burroughs's May 1886 visit, one-third of the student population at Smith had denounced the use of fashionable bird feathers and had joined the local Audubon Society. Burroughs, meanwhile, returned to campus every year to lead a bird walk, even after Merriam had left Smith.

When Merriam left Smith in June 1886, the Audubon Society had become popular, while her classmates continued to communicate through class letters with major life updates. As a special student, Merriam did not earn a degree after her four years of college, but the institution eventually presented her with a bachelor's degree in 1921, when she was 58 years old. Merriam's movement to protect birds from the millinery industry progressed after she left Smith: the Lacey Act of 1900 prohibited the trade of illegally acquired wildlife, while the Migratory Bird Treaty Act of 1918 made the protection of migratory birds a federal law.

== Nature writing and activism ==
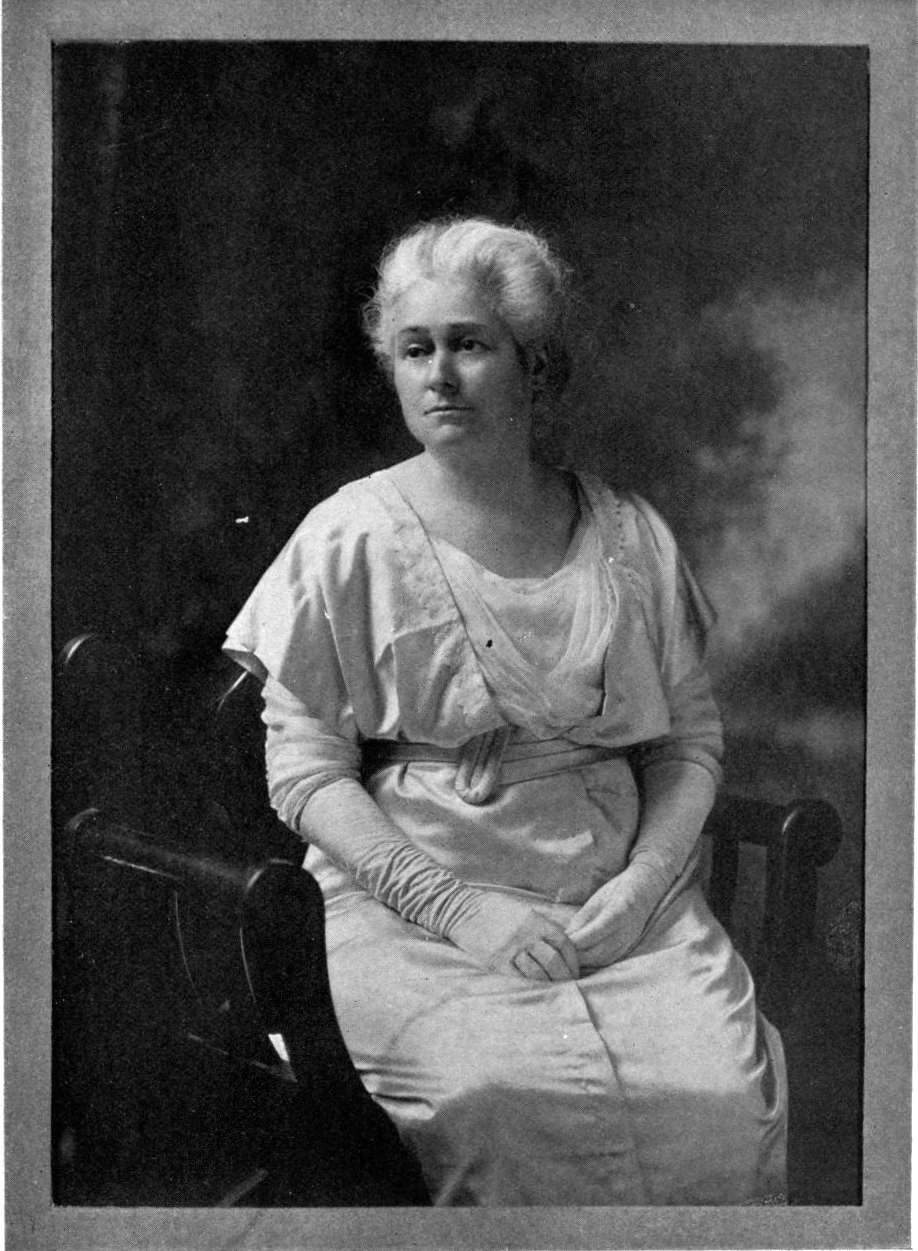
Bailey in 1916

=== Early writing and travels ===
After leaving Smith in 1886, Merriam, still unmarried, was caught between her desires to advance her nature writing and to contribute to the world socially. Her first articles on bird lore in Audubon Magazine appeared in 1887, and when she was not writing, Merriam joined her mother's volunteer work at social action clubs for working women and girls. In 1891, she spent one month in Chicago at a summer school for working girls founded as a branch of Jane Addams's Hull House, teaching a class on birds. The following summer, she worked in New York City at one of Grace Hoadley Dodge's social clubs.

Both Merriam and her mother suffered from poor health, possibly caused by tuberculosis, which led the family to take vacations in regions with climates that were thought to ease illness, such as the West Coast, Lake Placid, New York City, and Florida. In 1889, Merriam and her family traveled to San Diego County, at the homestead of her uncle Gustavus, in the hopes of improving the health of Merriam and her mother. In addition to easing her illness, the months-long stay in Southern California gave Merriam an interest in the Western United States and the avian life found there. During this time, Audubon Magazine had ceased publication, and Merriam decided to collect the fifty common birds whose profiles she had written for the magazine and collect them into a book. Birds Through an Opera-Glass, published in 1890 by Houghton Mifflin in Boston, was a collection of her Audubon profiles and 20 additional birds, also including appendices to help observers classify birds and additional reference materials for those who wished to continue their study.

Birds Through an Opera-Glass and Merriam's other work deviated from the ornithological studies of her contemporaries: rather than examining the bodies of trapped or killed birds in indoor settings, Merriam believed in observing wildlife outdoors in their natural environments, frequently through a pair of binoculars. The profiles in Birds Through an Opera-Glass ranged from half a page to five or six pages long and contained physical descriptions of the birds' appearance, song, nests, and habits, often accompanied by illustrations or musical notation. Author Scott Weidensaul has referred to Birds Through an Opera-Glass as "in a sense, the first field guide to American birds". While scientific ornithology was a male-dominated field, birdwatching had become more popular among women, as it allowed for amateur study.

Despite her publication, Merriam and the other female members of the American Ornithologists' Union were relegated to a "visibly subordinate level" compared to the male members. This did not change until 1901, when Merriam, Mabel Osgood Wright, Harriet Mann Miller, and a few other women achieved the rank of "elective member". Merriam was good friends with Miller, who had encouraged her writing early in her career and who had taught her techniques to remain unnoticed by the birds she was observing. In 1893, Merriam joined Miller in Utah, and she wrote about her experiences the following year in a book titled My Summer in a Mormon Village. Primarily a travel narrative, Merriam also included descriptions of nature and calls to end the killing of birds for sport. Her view of the members of the Church of Jesus Christ of Latter-day Saints that she encountered was regarded as complimentary for the time, although her brother had heavily edited the manuscript.

After leaving Utah, Merriam spent six months in California at Stanford University, which had been founded and was presided over by her brother's friend David Starr Jordan. There, she befriended the botanist Alice Eastwood. Merriam remained in California through August 1894, wanting to spend the summer months observing the bird life. During the spring months, she stayed at her uncle's ranch in the Twin Oaks Valley, writing what became A-Birding on a Bronco. Illustrated by Louis Agassiz Fuertes, then a student at Cornell University, A-Birding on a Bronco describes both Merriam's observations of the birds in California as well as her relationship with Canello, the white horse that she rode on her expeditions.

=== Washington, D.C., and partnership with her husband ===
When she was not travelling, Merriam lived in Washington, D.C., on the third floor of her brother's house with his wife and children. She returned there in full after a final trip to the San Francisco Mountains near Flagstaff, Arizona, and promptly became involved in local scientific organizations. Merriam was a member of the Women's National Science Club, helped found the Audubon Society of the District of Columbia, and worked with Miller on the American Ornithologists' Union's Committee on the Protection of North American Birds. In 1898, Merriam received her first invitation to join her brother on a field expedition, serving as an assistant for a group that studied the natural life in Mount Shasta, California.

She continued to write heavily, and her articles during this period were reprinted as How Birds Affect the Farm and Garden in 1896 and Birds of Village and Field in 1898. The latter work, subtitled A Bird Book for Beginners, was more technical than her previous books. Covering 212 birds, each entry began with the species' Latin name, physical characteristics, and geographical distribution. In addition to whole-bird drawings, there are also illustrations of specific body parts such as beaks, wings, and feet. Birdsong is written phonetically rather than as musical notation. Merriam also takes an increased ecological focus, describing both the birds' diets and how those diets affect agriculture. She also provides advice for how to construct structures that would protect birds from cats and hunters that would kill them.

On December 16, 1899, Merriam married Vernon Orlando Bailey, her brother's friend and a fellow member of the U.S. Biological Survey. C. Hart Merriam had become acquainted with Bailey when the latter was an adolescent in Minnesota. Bailey had written to Merriam, the author of Mammals of the Adirondacks, asking for help in identifying specimens that he had collected. In 1887, C. Hart, who had been appointed the head of the Division of Economic Ornithology and Mammalogy, appointed Bailey as a field agent for the U.S. Biological Survey at a wage of $40 per month. Merriam's husband's employment allowed her to incorporate the data, charts, and illustrations that the Biological Survey had conducted into her future works.

The Baileys first traveled together in April 1900, when they took a carriage from Corpus Christi to Brownsville, Texas. They continued to travel together over the next 30 years, with Merriam writing as her husband conducted field studies for the Biological Survey. The most ambitious of these works was her 1902 Handbook of Birds of the Western United States, the companion volume to Frank M. Chapman's Handbook of Birds of Eastern North America. The field notes that Merriam took in her travels were turned into over 50 articles appearing in periodicals such as The Auk and The Condor. Between 1902 and 1919, a work by Merriam appeared in almost every volume of The Condor. Many of these focused on the prairie wildlife in North Dakota, where her husband spent the summers from 1909 to 1916. Her notes from this region were turned into 17 papers for The Condor.

In 1917, the government asked the Baileys to create a visitor guide for the wildlife of Glacier National Park. Vernon contributed the sections on mammal life, while Florence wrote about the birds. Around this time, Edward William Nelson, chief of the U.S. Biological Survey, approached Merriam with a request. Wells Cooke had been in the midst of writing a survey on bird life in New Mexico before his unexpected death in 1916, and Nelson wanted Merriam to complete his work. While the manuscript for Birds of New Mexico was completed in 1919, many publishers were reluctant to take on the costs of producing an 800-page volume with maps and illustrations, and the book was not released until 1928, when the New Mexico Department of Game and Fish agreed to print and distribute it. Originally, the Biological Survey requested that both Cooke and Merriam be listed as authors, which Merriam resisted. Ultimately, her revisions to even Cooke's original work were seen as a significant enough contribution that she was listed as the sole author, with Cooke credited in the introduction. Two years later, Vernon Bailey published a companion piece to his wife's work, titled Mammals of New Mexico.

== Later life and death ==
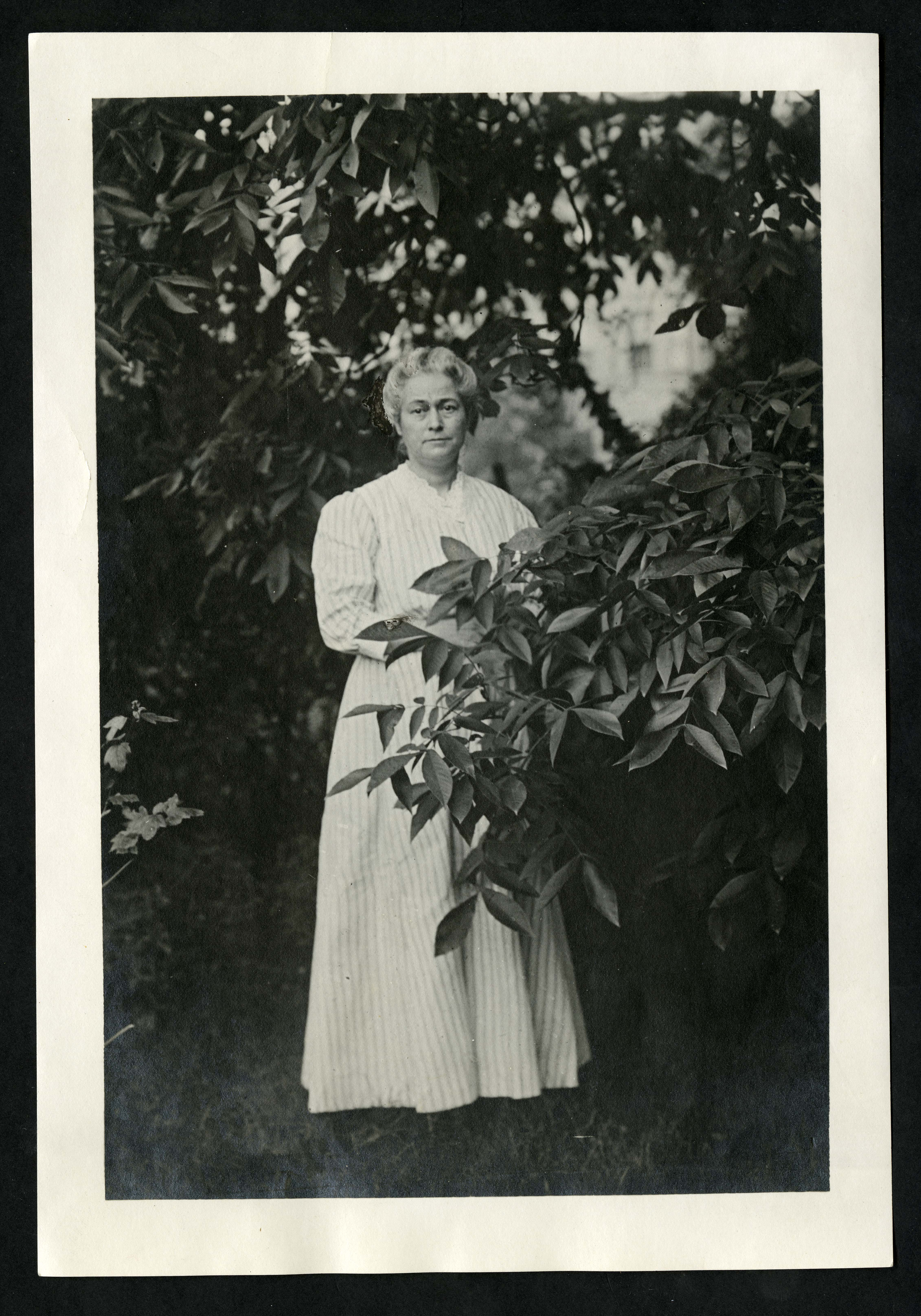
Undated photograph of Bailey

When they were not traveling, the Baileys resided in Washington, D.C., spending their final years at a house on 1834 Kalorama Road. Visitors recalled their home as ornately decorated with memorabilia gathered on their travels. The centerpiece of their home was a portrait of the Bengal tiger living then at the National Zoological Park. Painted by wildlife artist Charles R. Knight, Merriam bequeathed the painting to the Smithsonian Institution upon her death, and it now resides in the Smithsonian American Art Museum. Their Washington home was the subject of many dinner parties for naturalists, including Alice Eastwood, Clarence Birdseye, and fellow naturalist couple Olaus and Margaret Murie.

The Baileys never had children together: Merriam had married late, and her pregnancies had ended in miscarriage, but she loved children and worked with them through various regional and national associations, including the Boy Scouts of America, the Playground and Recreation Association of America, the National Housing Association, the National Child Labor Committee, and the Working Boys' Home in Washington. Merriam was also a devoted aunt to her grand-nieces Floddie and Deirdre, helping the former to enroll in George Washington University when she could not attend Smith College. Part of Merriam's mission was to educate children on wildlife preservation and observation. She hoped that the introduction of nature study into elementary and secondary classrooms would help children to learn about bird study and protection in school settings, which would encourage them to continue environmental study. Outside of the public school classroom, Merriam began teaching birding courses at the National Zoo in 1903. Her first class attracted only 15 students, but by 1913, over a dozen teachers were instructing over 100 students.

Although Birds of New Mexico seemed poised to be Merriam's magnum opus, she continued writing into the 1930s. The National Park Service published her last substantial work, Among the Birds of Grand Canyon National Park, in 1939, when Merriam was 76 years old. She also received a number of honors, beginning in 1929, when the American Ornithologists' Union elected Merriam their first female Fellow. Two years later, she became the first woman to receive the Brewster Medal, awarded biennially to the writer of the most important ornithological work on birds of the Western Hemisphere. In 1933, the University of New Mexico awarded Merriam an honorary doctorate.

Vernon Bailey retired from the U.S. Biological Survey in 1933 after 46 years of service, believing that it was time for a younger man to take over the position. After her husband's retirement, Merriam resigned from the Committee on Bird Protection and the couple attempted to retire in Twin Oaks. This was short-lived, as Florence was unhappy in their desert home, and they soon returned to Washington. Vernon and Florence took their final trip together in 1941, traveling to Upstate New York to see the aurora borealis. Vernon Bailey died in June 1942, after which Florence lived quietly. On September 22, 1948, at the age of 85, Merriam died of myocardial degeneration in her Washington home. She was buried in Locust Grove.

== Legacy ==
Many of Merriam's works were designed not for scientists but for amateur birdwatchers, and works such as Birds of Village and Field became popular guides for birders. Her works often incorporated the studies of both professional ornithologists like Frank M. Chapman, Robert Ridgway, and Theodore Sherman Palmer, but they also used the observations of amateurs who observed birds on their property and in their neighborhoods. Her works were designed to invest the public in appreciating wildlife, and in turn birdwatching became a popular hobby. Science writer Paul Henry Oehser referred to Merriam as "one of the most literary ornithologists of her time", while Robert Welker classified her with Miller, Mabel Osgood Wright, and Neltje Blanchan as the four most important female authors of bird books in the nineteenth century.

Parus gambeli baileyae, a subspecies of mountain chickadee from the mountains of Southern California, is named after Merriam. Joseph Grinnell identified the species in 1908, giving it the common name Mrs. Bailey's Chickadee as well as its scientific name. Merriam thanked Grinnell for the recognition, writing to him in a letter, "Parus has always been one of my favorite birds". Additionally, one of Merriam's apprentices, Pat Jenks, discovered an unmapped volcanic formation in Mexico while surveying lands that were sacred to Indigenous peoples of the Americas. He named the formation Bailey Crater in honor of Merriam, but as the site did not lie within United States borders, the name was never officially registered.

== Selected publications ==
Publication information derived from Harriet Kofalk's No Woman Tenderfoot: Florence Merriam Bailey, Pioneer Naturalist.

=== Books ===
- Bailey, Florence Merriam (1889). Birds Through an Opera-Glass. Boston, MA: Houghton Mifflin. doi:10.5962/bhl.title.60311.
- My Summer in a Mormon Village. Boston, MA: Houghton Mifflin. 1894.
- Bailey, Florence Augusta (Merriam) (1896). A-Birding on a Bronco. Boston, MA: Houghton Mifflin. doi:10.5962/bhl.title.12539.
- Bailey, Florence Merriam (1896). How Birds Affect the Farm and Garden. New York, NY: Forest and Stream Publishing. doi:10.5962/bhl.title.36220.
- Bailey, Florence Merriam (1898). Birds of Village and Field: A Bird Book for Beginners. Boston, MA: Houghton Mifflin. doi:10.5962/bhl.title.30028.
- Bailey, Florence Merriam (1902). Handbook of Birds of the Western United States, Including the Great Plains, Great Basin, Pacific Slope, and Lower Rio Grande Valley. Boston, MA: Houghton Mifflin. doi:10.5962/bhl.title.7872.
- Bailey, Florence Augusta (Merriam); Bailey, Vernon (1918). Wild Animals of Glacier National Park: The Mammals by Vernon Bailey, The Birds by Florence Merriam Bailey. Washington, DC: Government Printing Office. doi:10.5962/bhl.title.13645.
- Birds of New Mexico. Santa Fe, NM: New Mexico Dept. of Game and Fish in cooperation with the State Game Protective Association and the Bureau of Biological Survey. 1928. hdl:2027/mdp.39015019729311.
- Among the Birds in the Grand Canyon Country. Washington, DC: Government Printing Office. 1939.

=== Book chapters ===
- Chapman, Frank M. (1895). "Biographical Sketches". Handbook of birds of eastern North America. New York, NY: D. Appleton and Company. doi:10.5962/bhl.title.27183.
- Maynard, Lucy Warner (1898). "Introduction". Birds of Washington and vicinity, including adjacent parts of Maryland and Virginia. Baltimore, MD: The Lord Baltimore Press. doi:10.5962/bhl.title.7856.
- Rider, Fremont, ed. (1925). "The Fauna and Flora of California". Rider's California: A Guide-book for Travelers with 28 maps and plans. New York, NY: The Macmillan Company.

== Bibliography ==
- Barrow, Mark V. Jr. (1998). A Passion for Birds: American Ornithology after Audubon. Princeton, NJ: Princeton University Press. ISBN 0-691-04402-3.
- Bonta, Marcia Myers (1991). Women in the Field: America's Pioneering Women Naturalists. College Station, TX: Texas A&M University Press. ISBN 0-89096-467-X.
- Creese, Mary R. S.; Creese, Thomas M. (1998). Ladies in the Laboratory? American and British Women in Science, 1800–1900: A Survey of Their Contributions to Research. Lanham, MD and London, UK: The Scarecrow Press, Inc. ISBN 0-8108-3287-9.
- Holmes, Madelyn (2004). American Women Conservationists: Twelve Profiles. Jefferson, NC and London, UK: McFarland & Company, Inc. ISBN 0-7864-1783-8.
- Kofalk, Harriet (1989). No Woman Tenderfoot: Florence Merriam Bailey, Pioneer Naturalist. College Station, TX: Texas A&M University Press. ISBN 0-89096-378-9.
- "Gambel's Chickadee" (PDF). Sangre de Cristo Audubon Society.
- Oehser, Paul H. (January 1952). "In Memoriam: Florence Merriam Bailey". The Auk. 69 (1): 19–26. doi:10.2307/4081288. JSTOR 4081288.
- Oehser, Paul H. (1971). James, Edward T.; James, Janet Wilson; Boyer, Paul S. (eds.). Notable American Women 1607–1950: A Biographical Dictionary. Cambridge, MA and London, UK: The Belknap Press of Harvard University Press. pp. 82–83. ISBN 0-674-62734-2.
- Weidensaul, Scott (2007). Of a Feather: A Brief History of American Birding. Orlando, FL: Harcourt. ISBN 978-0-15-101247-3.
- Wolfe, Jonathan (July 17, 2019). "Overlooked No More: Florence Merriam Bailey, Who Defined Modern Bird-Watching". The New York Times.
