= Phenology =

Study of periodic events in biological life cycles

Phenology is the study of periodic events in biological life cycles and how these are influenced by seasonal and interannual variations in climate, as well as habitat factors (such as elevation).

Examples include the date of emergence of leaves and flowers, the first flight of butterflies, the first appearance of migratory birds, the date of leaf colouring and fall in deciduous trees, the dates of egg-laying of birds and amphibia, or the timing of the developmental cycles of temperate-zone honey bee colonies. In the scientific literature on ecology, the term is used more generally to indicate the time frame for any seasonal biological phenomena, including the dates of last appearance (e.g., the seasonal phenology of a species may be from April through September).

Because many such phenomena are very sensitive to small variations in climate, especially to temperature, phenological records can be a useful proxy for temperature in historical climatology, especially in the study of climate change and global warming. For example, viticultural records of grape harvests in Europe have been used to reconstruct a record of summer growing season temperatures going back more than 500 years. In addition to providing a longer historical baseline than instrumental measurements, phenological observations provide high temporal resolution of ongoing changes related to global warming.

== Etymology ==
The word is derived from the Greek φαίνω (phainō), "to show, to bring to light, make to appear" + λόγος (logos), amongst others "study, discourse, reasoning" and indicates that phenology has been principally concerned with the dates of first occurrence of biological events in their annual cycle.

The term was first used by Charles François Antoine Morren, a professor of botany at the University of Liège (Belgium). Morren was a student of Adolphe Quetelet. Quetelet made plant phenological observations at the Royal Observatory of Belgium in Brussels. He is considered "one of 19th century trendsetters in these matters." In 1839, he started his first observations and created a network over Belgium and Europe that reached a total of about 80 stations in the period 1840–1870.

Morren participated in 1842 and 1843 in Quetelets 'Observations of Periodical Phenomena' (Observations des Phénomènes périodiques), and at first suggested to mention the observations concerning botanical phenomena "anthochronological observations". That term had already been used in 1840 by Carl Joseph Kreutzer.

On 16 December 1849, Morren used the term 'phenology' for the first time in a public lecture at the Royal Academy of Science, Letters and Fine Arts of Belgium in Brussels, to describe "the specific science which has the goal to know the manifestation of life ruled by the time."

Four years later, Morren published "Phenological Memories". The term may not have been common in the decades to follow, as in an article in The Zoologist of 1899 describing an ornithological meeting in Sarajevo, where "questions of Phaenology" were discussed, a footnote by the Editor, William Lucas Distant, says: "This word is seldom used, and we have been informed by a very high authority that it may be defined as "Observational Biology", and as applied to birds, as it is here, may be taken to mean the study or science of observations on the appearance of birds".

== Records ==
=== Historical ===
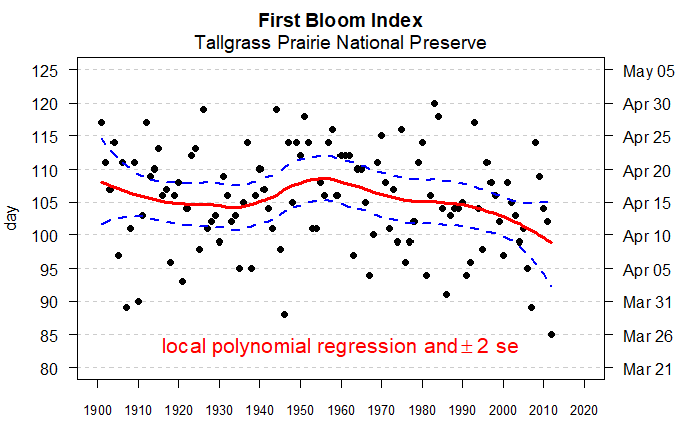
Historical day of year for first bloom index (FBI) for the Tallgrass Prairie National Preserve, Kansas (dots) fitted with a local polynomial regression model (loess in red) and a 2 standard error band (blue). Data from William Monahan.

Analyzing >250 US cities, all but two experienced fewer freezing days in 2025 than in 1956. In 2025, on average, freezing days began 11 days later and ended 26 days earlier. These shifts impact diseases, drinking water, and agriculture.

Observations of phenological events have provided indications of the progress of the natural calendar since ancient agricultural times. Many cultures have traditional phenological proverbs and sayings which indicate a time for action: "When the sloe tree is white as a sheet, sow your barley whether it be dry or wet" or attempt to forecast future climate: "If oak's before ash, you're in for a splash. If ash before oak, you're in for a soak". But the indications can be pretty unreliable, as an alternative version of the rhyme shows: "If the oak is out before the ash, 'Twill be a summer of wet and splash; If the ash is out before the oak, 'Twill be a summer of fire and smoke." Theoretically, though, these are not mutually exclusive, as one forecasts immediate conditions and one forecasts future conditions.

The North American Bird Phenology Program at USGS Patuxent Wildlife Research Center (PWRC) is in possession of a collection of millions of bird arrival and departure date records for over 870 species across North America, dating between 1880 and 1970. This program, originally started by Wells W. Cooke, involved over 3,000 observers including many notable naturalists of the time. The program ran for 90 years and came to a close in 1970 when other programs starting up at PWRC took precedence. The program was again started in 2009 to digitize the collection of records and now with the help of citizens worldwide, each record is being transcribed into a database which will be publicly accessible for use.

The English naturalists Gilbert White and William Markwick reported the seasonal events of more than 400 plant and animal species, Gilbert White in Selborne, Hampshire and William Markwick in Battle, Sussex over a 25-year period between 1768 and 1793. The data, reported in White's Natural History and Antiquities of Selborne are reported as the earliest and latest dates for each event over 25 years; so annual changes cannot therefore be determined.

In Japan and China, the time of blossoming of cherry and peach trees is associated with ancient festivals and some of these dates can be traced back to the eighth century. Such historical records may, in principle, be capable of providing estimates of climate at dates before instrumental records became available. For example, records of the harvest dates of the pinot noir grape in Burgundy have been used in an attempt to reconstruct spring–summer temperatures from 1370 to 2003; the reconstructed values during 1787–2000 have a correlation with Paris instrumental data of about 0.75.

=== Modern ===
==== Great Britain ====
Robert Marsham, the founding father of modern phenological recording, was a wealthy landowner who kept systematic records of "Indications of spring" on his estate at Stratton Strawless, Norfolk from 1736. These took the form of dates of the first occurrence of events, such as flowering, bud burst, emergence or flight of an insect. Generations of Marsham's family maintained consistent records of the same events or "phenophases" over unprecedentedly long periods of time, eventually ending with the death of Mary Marsham in 1958, so that trends can be observed and related to long-term climate records. The data show significant variation in dates which broadly correspond with warm and cold years. Between 1850 and 1950, a long-term trend of gradual climate warming is observable, and during this same period the Marsham record of oak-leafing dates tended to become earlier.

After 1960, the rate of warming accelerated, and this is mirrored by increasing earliness of oak leafing, recorded in the data collected by Jean Combes in Surrey. Over the past 250 years, the first leafing date of oak appears to have advanced by about 8 days, corresponding to overall warming on the order of 1.5 °C in the same period.

Towards the end of the 19th century, the recording of the appearance and development of plants and animals became a national pastime and, between 1891 and 1948, the Royal Meteorological Society (RMS) organised a programme of phenological recording across the British Isles. Up to 600 observers submitted returns in some years, with numbers averaging a few hundred. During this period, 11 main plant phenophases were consistently recorded over the 58 years from 1891 to 1948, and a further 14 phenophases were recorded for the 20 years between 1929 and 1948. The returns were summarised each year in the Quarterly Journal of the RMS as The Phenological Reports. Jeffree (1960) summarised the 58 years of data, which show that flowering dates could be as many as 21 days early and as many as 34 days late, with extreme earliness greatest in summer-flowering species, and extreme lateness in spring-flowering species. In all 25 species, the timings of all phenological events are significantly related to temperature, indicating that phenological events are likely to get earlier as climate warms.

The Phenological Reports ended suddenly in 1948 after 58 years, and Britain remained without a national recording scheme for almost 50 years, just at a time when climate change was becoming evident. During this period, individual dedicated observers made important contributions. The naturalist and author Richard Fitter recorded the First Flowering Date (FFD) of 557 species of British flowering plants in Oxfordshire between about 1954 and 1990. Writing in Science in 2002, Richard Fitter and his son Alistair Fitter found that "the average FFD of 385 British plant species has advanced by 4.5 days during the past decade compared with the previous four decades." They note that FFD is sensitive to temperature, as is generally agreed, that "150 to 200 species may be flowering on average 15 days earlier in Britain now than in the very recent past" and that these earlier FFDs will have "profound ecosystem and evolutionary consequences". In Scotland, David Grisenthwaite meticulously recorded the dates he mowed his lawn since 1984. His first cut of the year was 13 days earlier in 2004 than in 1984, and his last cut was 17 days later, providing evidence for an earlier onset of spring and a warmer climate in general.

National recording was resumed by Tim Sparks in 1998 and, from 2000, has been led by citizen science project Nature's Calendar , run by the Woodland Trust and the Centre for Ecology and Hydrology. Latest research shows that oak bud burst has advanced more than 11 days since the 19th century and that resident and migrant birds are unable to keep up with this change.

==== Mainland Europe ====
In Europe, phenological networks are operated in several countries, e.g. Germany's national meteorological service operates a very dense network with approx. 1200 observers, the majority of them on a voluntary basis. The Pan European Phenology (PEP) project is a database that collects phenological data from European countries. Currently 32 European meteorological services and project partners from across Europe have joined and supplied data.

In Geneva, Switzerland, the opening of the first leaf of an official chestnut tree (a horse chestnut) has been observed and recorded since 1818, thus forming the oldest set of records of phenological events in Switzerland. This task is conducted by the secretary of the Grand Council of Geneva (the local parliament), and the opening of the first leaf is announced publicly as indicating the beginning of the Spring. Data show a trend during the 20th century towards an opening that happens earlier and earlier.

==== Other countries ====
There is a USA National Phenology Network in which both professional scientists and lay recorders participate.

Many other countries, such as Canada (Alberta Plantwatch and Saskatchewan PlantWatch), China and Australia also have phenological programs.

In eastern North America, almanacs are traditionally used by farmers for information on action phenology (in agriculture), taking into account the astronomical positions at the time. William Felker has studied phenology in Ohio, US, since 1973 and now publishes "Poor Will's Almanack", a phenological almanac for farmers (not to be confused with a late 18th-century almanac by the same name).

In the Amazon rainforests of South America, the timing of leaf production and abscission has been linked to rhythms in gross primary production at several sites. Early in their lifespan, leaves reach a peak in their capacity for photosynthesis, and in tropical evergreen forests of some regions of the Amazon basin (particularly regions with long dry seasons), many trees produce more young leaves in the dry season, seasonally increasing the photosynthetic capacity of the forest.

== Airborne sensors ==
NDVI temporal profile for a typical patch of coniferous forest over a period of six years. This temporal profile depicts the growing season every year as well as changes in this profile from year to year due to climatic and other constraints. Data and graph are based on the MODIS sensor standard public vegetation index product. Data archived at the ORNL DAAC , courtesy of Dr. Robert Cook.

Recent technological advances in studying the earth from space have resulted in a new field of phenological research that is concerned with observing the phenology of whole ecosystems and stands of vegetation on a global scale using proxy approaches. These methods complement the traditional phenological methods which recorded the first occurrences of individual species and phenophases.

The most successful of these approaches is based on tracking the temporal change of a Vegetation Index (like Normalized Difference Vegetation Index(NDVI)). NDVI makes use of the vegetation's typical low reflection in the red (red energy is mostly absorbed by growing plants for Photosynthesis) and strong reflection in the Near Infrared (Infrared energy is mostly reflected by plants due to their cellular structure). Due to its robustness and simplicity, NDVI has become one of the most popular remote sensing based products. Typically, a vegetation index is constructed in such a way that the attenuated reflected sunlight energy (1% to 30% of incident sunlight) is amplified by ratio-ing red and NIR following this equation:

$$\mathrm{NDVI}={\mathrm{NIR}-\mathrm{red} \over \mathrm{NIR}+\mathrm{red}}$$

The evolution of the vegetation index through time, depicted by the graph above, exhibits a strong correlation with the typical green vegetation growth stages (emergence, vigor/growth, maturity, and harvest/senescence). These temporal curves are analyzed to extract useful parameters about the vegetation growing season (start of season, end of season, length of growing season, etc.). Other growing season parameters could potentially be extracted, and global maps of any of these growing season parameters could then be constructed and used in all sorts of climatic change studies.

A noteworthy example of the use of remote sensing based phenology is the work of Ranga Myneni from Boston University. This work showed an apparent increase in vegetation productivity that most likely resulted from the increase in temperature and lengthening of the growing season in the boreal forest. Another example based on the MODIS enhanced vegetation index (EVI) reported by Alfredo Huete at the University of Arizona and colleagues showed that the Amazon rainforest, as opposed to the long-held view of a monotonous growing season or growth only during the wet rainy season, does in fact exhibit growth spurts during the dry season.

However, these phenological parameters are only an approximation of the true biological growth stages. This is mainly due to the limitation of current space-based remote sensing, especially the spatial resolution, and the nature of vegetation index. A pixel in an image does not contain a pure target (like a tree, a shrub, etc.) but contains a mixture of whatever intersected the sensor's field of view.

== Phenological mismatch ==
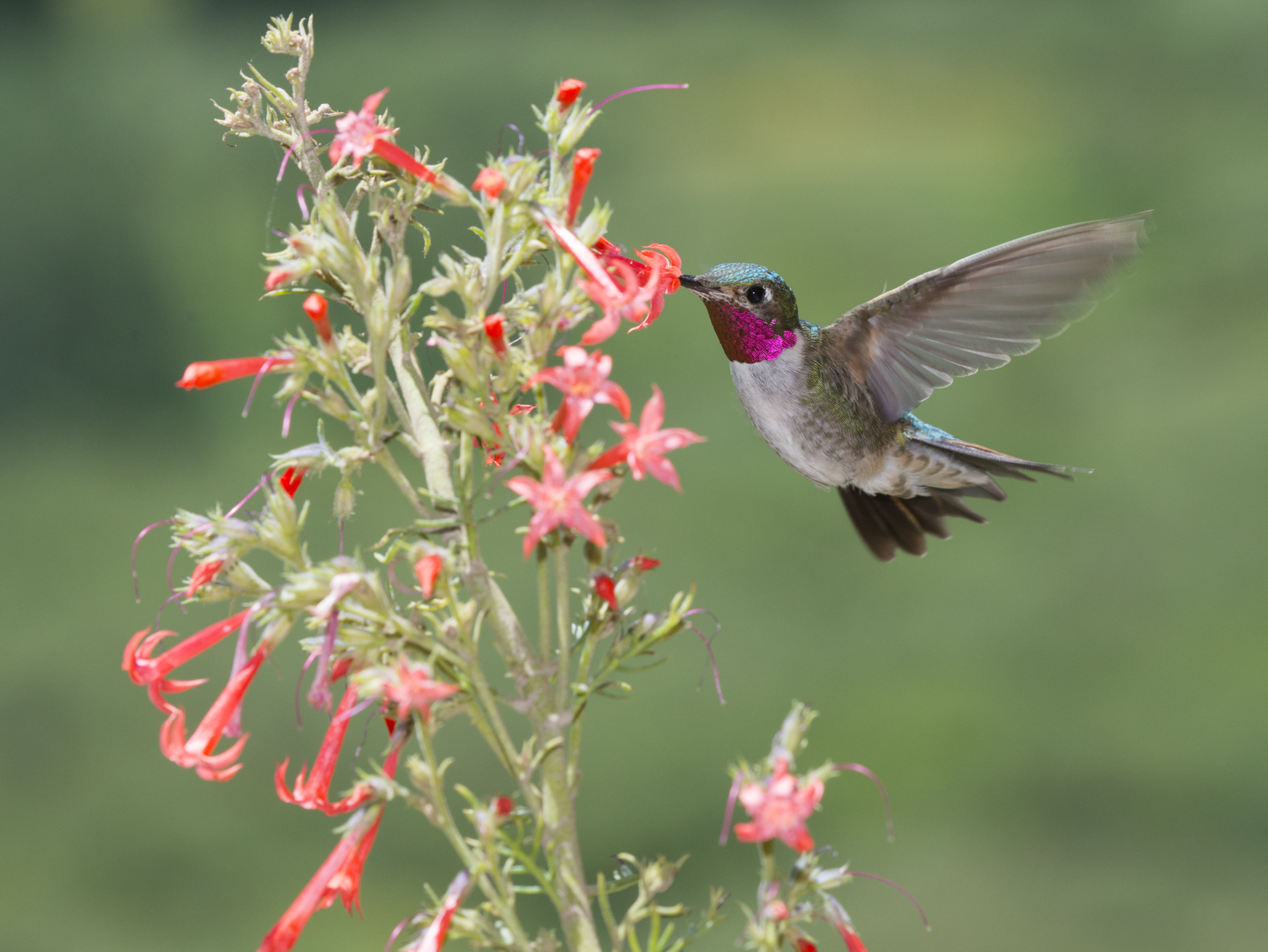
A hummingbird visiting and pollinating a flower. If the flower blooms too early in the season, or if the humming bird has a delay in migration, this interaction will be lost.

Most species, including both plants and animals, interact with one another within ecosystems and habitats, known as biological interactions. These interactions (whether it be plant-plant, animal-animal, predator-prey or plant-animal interactions) can be vital to the success and survival of populations and therefore species.

Many species experience changes in life cycle development, migration or in some other process/behavior at different times in the season than previous patterns depict due to warming temperatures. Phenological mismatches, where interacting species change the timing of regularly repeated phases in their life cycles at different rates, creates a mismatch in interaction timing and therefore negatively harming the interaction. Mismatches can occur in many different biological interactions, including between species in one trophic level (intratrophic interactions) (i.e. plant-plant), between different trophic levels (intertrophic interactions) (i.e. plant-animal) or through creating competition (intraguild interactions). For example, if a plant species blooms its flowers earlier than previous years, but the pollinators that feed on and pollinate this flower do not arrive or grow earlier as well, then a phenological mismatch has occurred. This results in the plant population declining as there are no pollinators to aid in their reproductive success. Another example includes the interaction between plant species, where the presence of one species aids in the pollination of another through attraction of pollinators. However, if these plant species develop at mismatched times, this interaction will be negatively affected and therefore the plant species that relies on the other will be harmed.

Phenological mismatches means the loss of many biological interactions and therefore ecosystem functions are also at risk of being negatively affected or lost all together. Phenological mismatches will effect species and ecosystems food webs, reproduction success, resource availability, population and community dynamics in future generations, and therefore evolutionary processes and overall biodiversity.

== See also ==
- Citizen science – Amateur scientific research
- Nature Detectives – Woodland conservation charity in the UK
- Season creep – Phenomenon of seasons slowly changing their timing
- Growing degree-day – Heuristic tool in phenology
- Biological life cycle – Series of stages of an organism

== Sources ==
- Demarée, Gaston R; Rutishauser, This (2011). "From "Periodical Observations" to "Anthochronology" and "Phenology" – the scientific debate between Adolphe Quetelet and Charles Morren on the origin of the word "Phenology"" (PDF). International Journal of Biometeorology. 55 (6): 753–761. Bibcode:2011IJBm...55..753D. doi:10.1007/s00484-011-0442-5. PMID 21713602. S2CID 1486224. Archived from the original (PDF) on 2020-12-04.
