= David Lenz =

American painter

David Lenz (born 14 August 1962 in Milwaukee, Wisconsin) is an American portrait painter.

He began his career in 1990. Lenz won the grand prize in the 2006 inaugural Outwin Boochever Portrait Competition organized by the National Portrait Gallery. Lenz's winning entry was entitled Sam and the Perfect World.

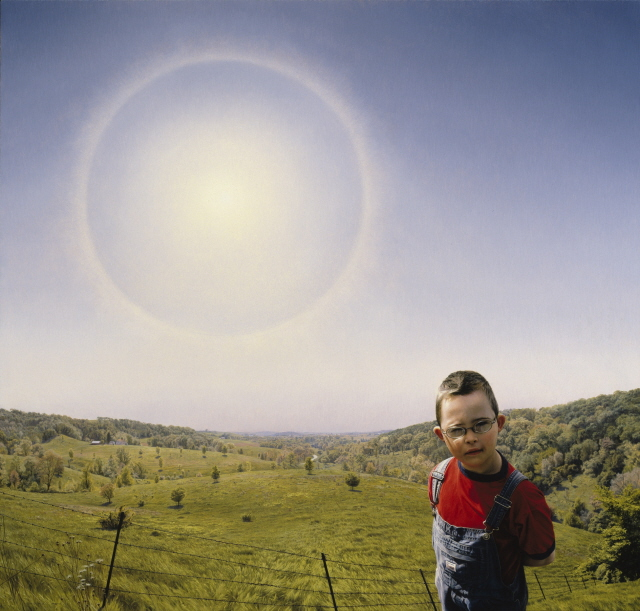
Sam and the Perfect World, David Lenz, 2005, oil on linen, 44" x 46". Collection of the Milwaukee Art Museum

== Biography ==
The grandson of painter Nic Lenz, and the son of an art dealer, Lenz received a bachelor of fine arts degree from the University of Wisconsin–Milwaukee in 1985. In the spring of 1989, after four years in publishing and advertising as an art director, Lenz left commercial art to become a full-time fine artist. At first he painted landscapes based on his travels to northern Wisconsin and Quetico Provincial Park in Ontario, Canada. These early paintings were influenced greatly by Tom Uttech, a professor at the University of Wisconsin–Milwaukee, and by the luminous light quality of Hudson River School artists Albert Bierstadt, Frederic Church, and Sanford Gifford.

After moving to the east side of Milwaukee, Lenz began to paint the neighborhoods and people of the central city. The city's children, mostly African-American, very quickly became the focus of his paintings. In these works, completed between about 1990 to 2000, the hope and vitality of the children's faces contrasts starkly with the worn down reused sidewalks, streets, and houses of the central city.

In 1999, Lenz embarked on a series of paintings depicting the lives of Wisconsin dairy farmers Ervin and Mercedes Wagner. The never-ending work of dairy farming, the toll it takes on the body, and the cultural isolation of rural life are themes of this series. Between 2000 and 2005 Lenz almost exclusively painted pictures of the Wagners and their farm. This series has been exhibited extensively in regional museums throughout the Midwest. Thistles, completed in 2001, is perhaps the most widely reproduced and celebrated painting of the Wagner Farm series.

The third area of interest for the artist, paintings depicting the lives of people with intellectual disabilities, was inspired by the birth of his son Sam, who was born with Down syndrome. Lenz contemplated the series for eight years until, in the summer of 2005, he entered the first major painting of the series in the Outwin Boochever Portrait Competition.

== The work ==
From a short distance Lenz's paintings appear to be photo realistic, but are made up of thousands of brushstrokes. Lenz starts a new painting by initially working out ideas in small pencil “thumbnail” drawings. The artist then photographs all the various elements of the image individually. These are used as the main reference material for the final painting. For a major work, he also completes an extensive array of color sketches. After the composition is fully developed, the image is drawn out carefully with pencil on a stretched canvas or board. Lenz's painting technique is quite traditional; straight oil paint is applied using small round sable brushes over a primed and warmly tinted linen canvas.

Lenz's subjects are people who society has taken for granted, forgotten, or overlooked. These people are portrayed in an empathic way, and the extensive landscape surrounding the subjects describes their lives and the community beyond. Lenz incorporates various elements as metaphors to deepen the meaning of his images. Sometimes Lenz takes dramatic liberties with reality, and the use of metaphors occasionally drives the scene toward the surreal.

One reoccurring theme in Lenz's work is that life's limits can be transcended with perseverance, personal heroism, and divine oversight.

In “Sam and the Perfect World,” the hills of Wisconsin are a metaphor for a modern civil society that values perfection. Humankind has transformed the landscape for their own use, altering this Garden of Eden, and erected a barbed wire fence; separating Sam for the rest of the world. A halo around the sun is said to represent a deity looking down upon the handwork of humankind. Without idealization or sentimentality Lenz portrays his son with his red shirt and Oshkosh overalls to show he is like any other boy, and yet he is not. “Nevertheless,” the artist says, Sam has “something very important to say.”

Lenz is influenced by the isolated figures of Edward Hopper, the regionalist sensibility of Grant Wood, and by the symbolic meaning infused in the people and objects of Andrew Wyeth.

The Outwin Boochever Portrait Competition first place award also entitled Lenz to paint a portrait of a remarkable American for the Smithsonian National Portrait Gallery's permanent collection. On May 9, 2009, the Gallery unveiled Lenz's historic portrait of Eunice Kennedy Shriver, the first portrait the Gallery has ever commissioned of an individual who had not been a U.S. President or First Lady. The portrait depicts Mrs. Shriver with four Special Olympics athletes and one Best Buddies participant on the beach near her Cape Cod home. In the painting from left to right are Airika Straka (Special Olympics Wisconsin), Katie Meade (Best Buddies Iowa), Andy Leonard (Special Olympics Ohio), Loretta Claiborne (Special Olympics Pennsylvania), Mrs. Shriver, and Marty Sheets (Special Olympics North Carolina).

In 2010, his commission "Wishes in the Wind", depicting three disadvantaged Milwaukee children blowing soap bubbles, was hung in the Wisconsin Governor's Mansion. In 2011, newly elected Wisconsin Governor Scott Walker removed the painting and replaced it with a 140-year-old portrait of Old Abe the War Eagle. She is the most famous of all Civil War mascots.

== Awards ==
Besides winning the grand prize in the 2006 Outwin Boochever Portrait Competition, Lenz also was included in the 2006 Midwest Edition of New American Paintings. In 2008, Lenz was awarded a Wisconsin Visual Art Lifetime Achievement Award, and in 2009 he was inducted as a fellow of the Wisconsin Academy of Sciences, Arts and Letters.
