= David Grisenthwaite =

David Grisenthwaite is an amateur phenological data recorder from Kirkcaldy, Fife, Scotland, United Kingdom. Since 1984 he has meticulously recorded the dates he has mowed his lawn. When his data was discovered by meteorologists it was hailed as an important find in recording climate change. Mr Grisenthwaite's first cut of the year was 13 days earlier in 2004 than in 1984, while his last cut was 17 days later, thus providing evidence for an earlier onset of spring and a warmer climate in general. He has been featured in several newspaper articles, touted as a "Great British eccentric."

David Grisenthwaite's work was credited in an article for Weather, the Royal Meteorological Society journal, entitled "The Grass is Greener – For Longer."
