= North American Bird Phenology Program =

- Successor: USA National Phenology Network
- Founded: 1881
- Founder: Wells Cooke
- Dissolved: 1970
- Location: Patuxent Wildlife Research Center
- Region served: North America
- Products: Bird migration records
- Affiliations: American Ornithologists' Union, United States Geological Survey
- Volunteers: 3000 (peak number)
- Website: https://www.usgs.gov/centers/pwrc/science/north-american-bird-phenology-program

The North American Bird Phenology Program houses a collection of six million Migration Observer Cards that contain information regarding migration patterns and population status of the birds of North America. These handwritten cards contain almost all of what was known of bird distribution and natural history from the latter part of the 19th century through World War II. The bulk of the records are the result of the work of a network of observers who recorded migration arrival dates in the spring and fall in a program that, in its heyday, involved 3000 participants. Today, those records are being processed and placed into a modern database for analysis. This information will be used, along with recently collected arrival times of migrant birds, and in conjunction with historical weather data, to examine how bird migration may be affected by climate change. This analysis aims to provide information on bird distribution, migration timing and migration pathways and how they are changing.

== History ==
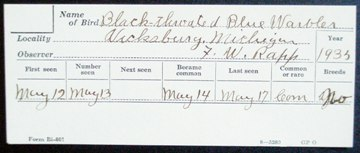
A migration card on Black-throated Blue Warbler. A large percentage of the cards are in this form.

The program began in 1881 by Wells W. Cooke, who wanted to broaden knowledge and understanding of bird migration. While teaching on the White Earth Indian Reservation in Minnesota, Cooke began noting the arrival dates of migratory birds. He later coordinated volunteers throughout the Mississippi Flyway to collect arrival and departure data.

His success sparked the interest of the newly formed American Ornithologists' Union (AOU), who convened a committee on the distribution and migration of birds and chose C. Hart Merriam to be its chief. The AOU expanded the volunteer network to include the entire United States, Canada, and a portion of the West Indies. The program outgrew the capabilities of the AOU and was then passed, in the late 1880s, to the Division of Economic Ornithology where it reached its greatest extent of 3000 volunteers.

The Division of Economic Ornithology would later become the Bureau of Biological Survey and eventually lead to the creation of the US Fish and Wildlife Service.

Although the program was actively maintained by the Federal Government, participation gradually declined and, in 1970, the program was closed. For many years since, these records have been kept safe by the United States Geological Survey (USGS).

== Wells W. Cooke ==
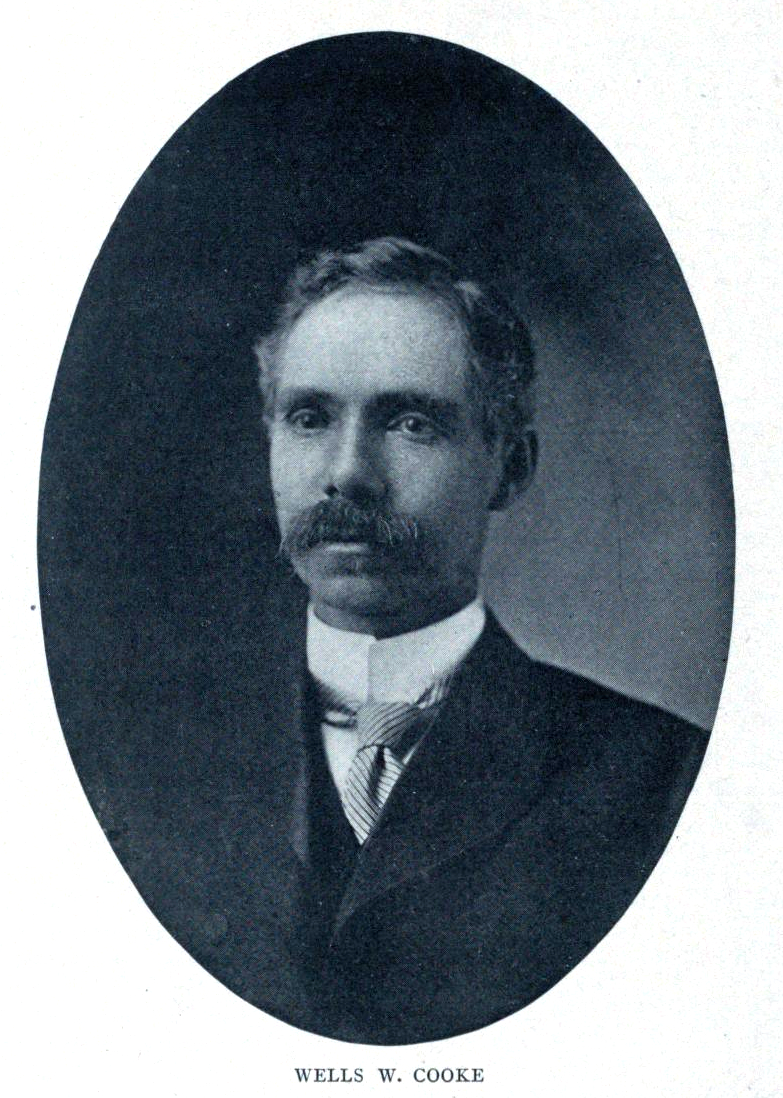
Wells Cooke

Wells W. Cooke, son of Reverend Elisha Woodbridge Cook and Martha Miranda (Smith) Cook, was born on January 25, 1858, in Haydenville, Massachusetts. The 5th of nine children and eldest boy, Cooke developed an interest in natural history at the age of 12, when he received his first gun. He was known to collect bird specimens from his neighborhood and surrounding area. Cooke went on to receive an A.B. and A.M. degree from Ripon College. After his marriage to Carrie Amy Raymond in 1879, Cooke became a teacher in Indian schools and secondary schools in Minnesota. It was here, in Minnesota, that Cooke first began documenting arrival dates and began what is now the BPP.

Notably, Wells Cooke, became a member of the newly formed American Ornithologists' Union in 1884, elected in part due to papers he published while teaching in the Mississippi Valley. In 1885, Cooke became a Professor, and over a 16-year period was associated with three colleges: the University of Vermont, the Agricultural College of Colorado, and the state College of Pennsylvania. Cooke also began an appointment with the Biological Survey in the U.S. Department of Agriculture in 1901 which lasted for 15 years, in which he published many publications on bird migration and distribution. Wells W. Cooke contributed in countless ways to the field of ornithology. He was the most eminent biologist on bird migration and distribution of his time.

== Chandler Robbins ==
Chandler "Chan" Robbins was one of the last coordinators of the BPP before it stopped accepting migration records in 1970. He is a lifelong birder and casts a long shadow in the birding world. In an interview conducted by Sam Droege, Chan talks about the history of the BPP, how it began, who ran the program and why it came to a close.

== Migration Cards ==
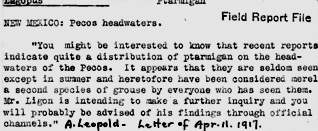
card submitted by Aldo Leopold

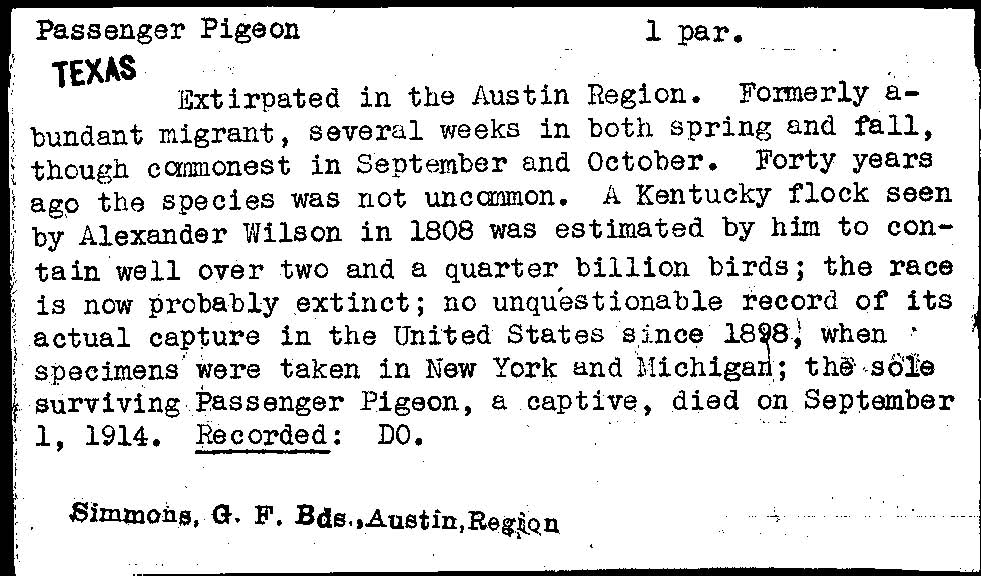
passenger pigeon migration card

== BPP Office ==
The Bird Phenology Program office is located at Patuxent Wildlife Research Center in Beltsville, Maryland.
