= Katie Meade =

American model

- Born: May 18, 1983 (age 42); Des Moines, Iowa
- Occupation: Model
- Modeling information
- Height: 4 ft 10 in (147 cm)
- Hair color: black
- Eye color: brown

Kathryn "Katie" Meade (born 18 May 1983) is an American model, widely considered to be "the first model with Down syndrome to become the face of a beauty campaign."

Meade was born in Des Moines, Iowa in a family of three female children to Tom and Becky Meade. She experienced many health problems ever since early childhood, being diagnosed with Down syndrome and having undergone two open heart surgeries. Meade attended mainstream classes at Herbert Hoover High School, where she reports having been bullied by other students due to her condition. While in high school, she joined Best Buddies International. It was while working as an ambassador for the organization that she was approached by Beauty and Pin-Ups to become the face of their 2016 "Fearless" range, thus becoming the first model with Down syndrome to front a beauty campaign.

In addition to being a model, Meade has also participated in the Special Olympics, winning the gold medal for the balance beam in Raleigh at the 1999 Special Olympics World Summer Games. Four years later, at the 2003 World Games in Dublin, she introduced U2's performance. During her career, she has befriended many famous people, most notably Rob Lowe and Tom Brady. When Meade was hit by a car in October 2016, the NFL star sent her a video message, wishing her full recovery.

As of 2017, she works as Office Generalist at the Polk County Treasurer's Office.

== See also ==
- Jamie Brewer
- Madeline Stuart
