= Paul Henry Oehser =

American journalist

- Born: 1900s
- Died: 4 December 1996
- Education: Greenville University
- Employers: National Geographic Society (Unknown–1975); Smithsonian Institution (1930s–1962); United States Department of Agriculture (1925–Unknown)

Paul Henry Oehser (27 March 1904, Cherry Creek, New York – 4 December 1996, Boone, North Carolina) was a writer of three books and an editor of scientific publications.

Oehser graduated in 1925 from Greenville College in Illinois. Soon after graduation he moved to Washington, D.C. to work for the Bureau of Biological Survey as an assistant scientific editor. Beginning in 1931 he was an editor working for the Smithsonian Institution and in 1950 became director of the Institution's Editorial and Publications Division. From 1951 to 1966 he continued as director but also served as the Smithsonian Institution's public relations officer. He retired from the Institution in 1966 and then worked from 1966 to 1975 for the National Geographic Society as an editor of scientific reports. He was on the Wilderness Society's Governing Council. At various times he was secretary, bulletin editor, and president of the Cosmos Club. He was president of the Washington Biologists’ Field Club from 1964 to 1967.

He had a wife and two sons.

== Selected publications ==
=== as editor ===
- American Scientific Congress (8th : 1940 : Washington, D.C.) Proceedings of the eighth American scientific congress held in Washington May 10-18, 1940, under the auspices of the government of the United States of America. 1941.
  - Actas del octavo Congreso científico americano. 1941.
- United States encyclopedia of history. 1968. 16 volumes 1967–68; juvenile audience. 2nd edition. 1970.
- Smithsonian Institution. Knowledge among men: eleven essays on science, culture, and society commemorating the 200th anniversary of the birth of James Smithson. Introd. by S. Dillon Ripley. [Edited and with introds. by Paul H. Oehser]. 1966. reprint. 1970. 2nd edition, rev. and expanded. Boulder, Colo: Westview Press. 1983.

=== as author ===
- Sons of science; the story of the Smithsonian Institution and its leaders. 1949; 220 pages. reprint. 1968.
- Fifty poems; with illus. by Grace E. Oehser. 1954.
- Witch of Scrapfaggot Green & other folderol : ballades, epitaphs, fables, country poems, sonnets, essays. 1981.
