= Wells Cooke =

American ornithologist (1858–1916)

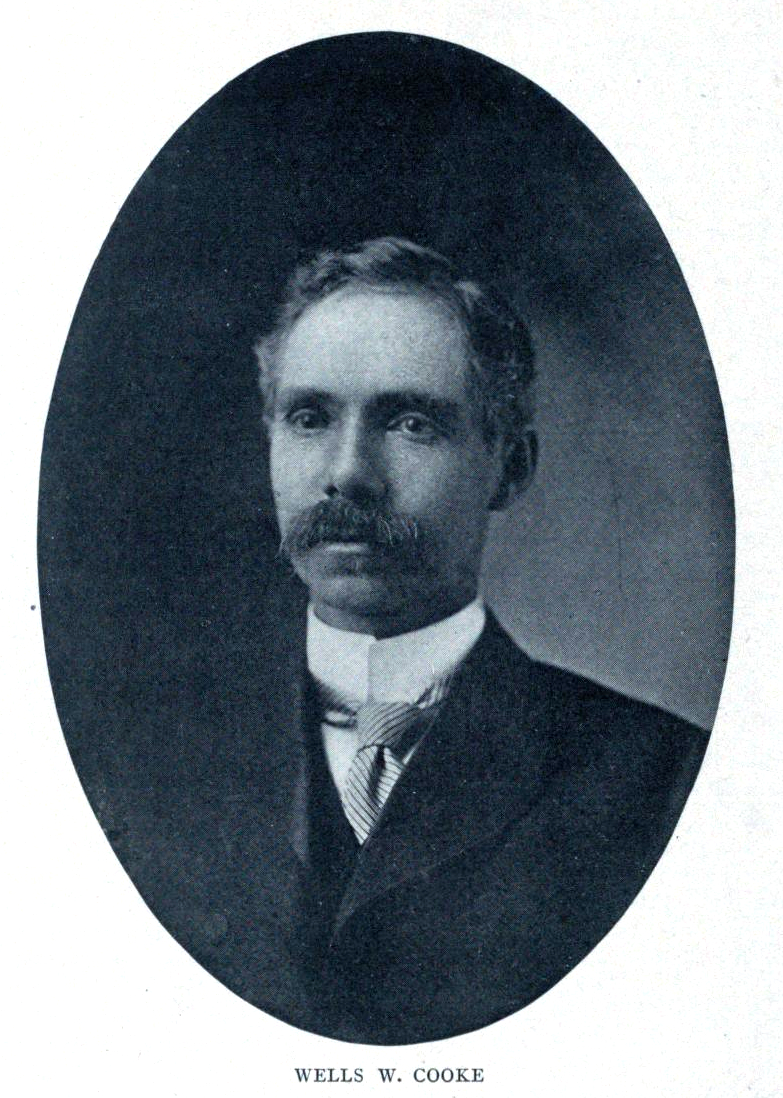

Wells Woodbridge Cooke (25 January 1858 – 30 March 1916), was an American ornithologist who was called the “father of cooperative study of bird migration in America”.

Cooke was the fifth child (of nine) and the eldest son of Rev. Elisha Woodbridge Cook, a Congregational minister, and Martha Miranda (Smith) Cook. He was born at Haydenville, Massachusetts and grew up largely in the lake region of eastern Wisconsin where he showed an early interest in natural history. Given a gun at about 12 years of age, he began collecting bird specimens.

He studied at Ripon College and the University of Iowa, eventually graduating from Ripon with an AB degree in 1879 and achieving an AM degree in 1882. In 1879 he married Carrie Amy Raymond. After graduating he worked as a teacher in Indian schools in several states for the next six years.

For 16 years from 1885 he worked in colleges, being associated with the University of Vermont (1885–1893) where he was appointed Professor of Agriculture in 1886, the Agricultural College of Colorado (1893–1900), and the State College of Pennsylvania (1900–1901).

== Ornithology ==
During the period he was teaching in the Indian school system, Cooke produced several papers on birds and began to focus on bird migration. In the winter of 1881–82 Cooke asked for ornithologists in Iowa to send him lists of winter residents and the dates of the first arrivals of spring migrants for a long-term study which later expanded to cover the whole Mississippi valley.

In 1901 Cooke was appointed to a position in the Biological Survey section of the United States Department of Agriculture, based in Washington, D.C. There, for the last 15 years of his life, he worked mainly on bird migration and distribution, building on the earlier records and network of participants he started in 1881. He accumulated individual records of migration on cards, many of which he wrote himself, with the total number of cards reaching one million in 1915. He also published extensively on bird distribution and migration, with a bibliography of over 400 items. He died quite suddenly, of pneumonia in Washington, at the age of 58.

The ninety years of records that Cooke accumulated, along with those who followed him, are now held by the North American Bird Phenology Program.
