= Florence Rabier =

French meteorologist (born 1964)

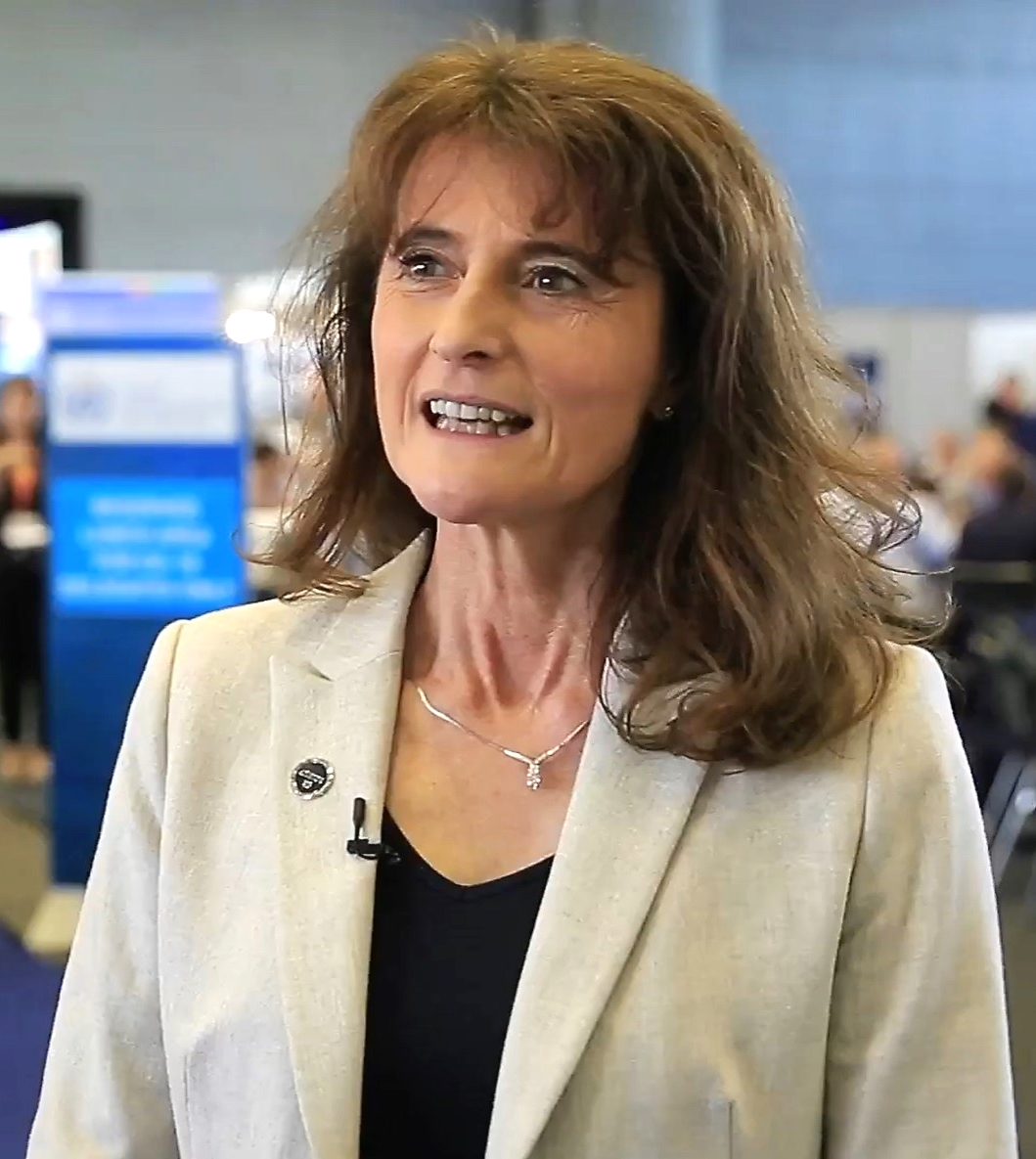
- Florence Rabier
- Born: 1964 (age 61–62)
- Education: Université Pierre et Marie Curie; École nationale de la météorologie Toulouse III - Paul Sabatier University
- Scientific career
- Workplaces: European Centre for Medium-Range Weather Forecasts; Météo-France
- Thesis: Assimilation variationnelle de donnees meteorologiques en presence d'instabilite barocline (1992)

Florence Rabier (born 1964) is a French meteorologist who was director-general of the European Centre for Medium-Range Weather Forecasts from 2016 to 2025. She works on numerical weather prediction (NWP). She was appointed a Knight of the Legion of Honour in 2014, and she was elected President of the European Meteorological Society in 2026.

== Early life and education ==
Rabier joined Météo-France as an undergraduate engineer in meteorology from the École nationale de la météorologie. After completing her undergraduate she joined the Toulouse III - Paul Sabatier University, where she earned a master's degree in meteorology. She moved to the University of Paris (Pierre and Marie Curie University) for her doctoral studies, where she researched variational assimilation of meteorological observations in the presence of baroclinic instabilities.

== Research and career ==
From 1992 to 1998, Rabier worked at the European Centre for Medium-Range Weather Forecasts (ECMWF), where she developed four dimensional variational data assimilation methods for NWP.

In 1998 she returned to Météo-France, where she was head of the observations team and then, from 2011, deputy director of GMAP (Groupe de Modélisation pour l'Assimilation et la Prévision). During this period, she improved methods for assimilating satellite observations in NWP. This included working on data from the Infrared Atmospheric Sounding Interferometer (IASI), an instrument on European meteorological satellites which provides information on atmospheric temperature and humidity. During the International Polar Year (2007–2008) she played a leading role in the ConcordIASI field campaign over Antarctica.

Rabier moved back to the ECMWF in 2013, where she served as Director of Forecasts. In 2016 Rabier was appointed Director-General of ECMWF. She was Chair of the European Space Agency Advisory Committee on Earth Observations from 2021 to 2023. From 2021, she has been a member of the international scientific board of the IFAB (International Foundation for Artificial Intelligence and Big Data). In 2022, she was promoted to Ingenieur general de classe exceptionnelle.

== Awards and honours ==
- 1994 Prix Prudhomme of the Société météorologique de France for her PhD thesis
- 2014 Chevalier de la Légion d'honneur
- 2014 Académie de l'air et de l'espace Grand Prix de l'Académie
- 2022 Honorary Member American Meteorological Society
- 2024 Elected member of the French Academy of Technologies
- 2025 Silver Medal of the European Meteorological Society
- 2025 Elected Honorary Fellow of the Royal Meteorological Society
- 2026 President of the European Meteorological Society
- 2026 IMO Prize of the World Meteorological Organisation

== Selected publications ==
- Rabier, F.; Järvinen, H.; Klinker, E.; Mahfouf, J.-F.; Simmons, A. (April 2000). "The ECMWF operational implementation of four-dimensional variational assimilation. I: Experimental results with simplified physics". Quarterly Journal of the Royal Meteorological Society. 126 (564): 1143–1170. Bibcode:2000QJRMS.126.1143R. doi:10.1002/qj.49712656415.
- Rabier, F.; McNally, A.; Andersson, E.; Courtier, P.; Undén, P.; Eyre, J.; Hollingsworth, A.; Bouttier, F. (July 1998). "The ECMWF implementation of three-dimensional variational assimilation (3D-Var). II: Structure functions". Quarterly Journal of the Royal Meteorological Society. 124 (550): 1809–1829. Bibcode:1998QJRMS.124.1809R. doi:10.1002/qj.49712455003.
- Klinker, E.; Rabier, F.; Kelly, G.; Mahfouf, J.-F. (April 2000). "The ecmwf operational implementation of four-dimensional variational assimilation. III: Experimental results and diagnostics with operational configuration". Quarterly Journal of the Royal Meteorological Society. 126 (564): 1191–1215. Bibcode:2000QJRMS.126.1191K. doi:10.1002/qj.49712656417.
- Rabier, F.; Klinker, E.; Courtier, P.; Hollingsworth, A. (January 1996). "Sensitivity of forecast errors to initial conditions". Quarterly Journal of the Royal Meteorological Society. 122 (529): 121–150. Bibcode:1996QJRMS.122..121R. doi:10.1002/qj.49712252906.
- Rabier, Florence; Fourrié, Nadia; Chafäi, Djalil; Prunet, Pascal (April 2002). "Channel selection methods for Infrared Atmospheric Sounding Interferometer radiances". Quarterly Journal of the Royal Meteorological Society. 128 (581): 1011–1027. Bibcode:2002QJRMS.128.1011R. doi:10.1256/0035900021643638.
- Liu, Z.-Q.; Rabier, F. (October 2003). "The potential of high-density observations for numerical weather prediction: A study with simulated observations". Quarterly Journal of the Royal Meteorological Society. 129 (594): 3013–3035. Bibcode:2003QJRMS.129.3013L. doi:10.1256/qj.02.170.
- Rabier, Florence; Bouchard, Aurélie; Brun, Eric; Doerenbecher, Alexis; Guedj, Stéphanie; Guidard, Vincent; Karbou, Fatima; Peuch, Vincent-Henri; El Amraoui, Laaziz; Puech, Dominique; Genthon, Christophe; Picard, Ghislain; Town, Michael; Hertzog, Albert; Vial, François; Cocquerez, Philippe; Cohn, Stephen A.; Hock, Terry; Fox, Jack; Cole, Hal; Parsons, David; Powers, Jordan; Romberg, Keith; VanAndel, Joseph; Deshler, Terry; Mercer, Jennifer; Haase, Jennifer S.; Avallone, Linnea; Kalnajs, Lars; Mechoso, C. Roberto; Tangborn, Andrew; Pellegrini, Andrea; Frenot, Yves; Thépaut, Jean-Noël; McNally, Anthony; Balsamo, Gianpaolo; Steinle, Peter (January 2010). "The Concordiasi Project in Antarctica". Bulletin of the American Meteorological Society. 91 (1): 69–86. Bibcode:2010BAMS...91...69R. doi:10.1175/2009BAMS2764.1.
- Venuti, Fabio; Rabier, Florence; Andersson, Erik; Modigliani, Umberto; English, Stephen; Kitchen, Christine; Berrone, Matthieu; Pinsault, Dorian; Debrux, Julie; Jarraud, Michel (June 2025). "ECMWF's societal impact through service provision, partnerships and collaborations". Journal of the European Meteorological Society. 2 100013. doi:10.1016/j.jemets.2025.100013.
- Magnusson, L.; Bidlot, J.-R.; Bonavita, M.; Brown, A. R.; Browne, P. A.; De Chiara, G.; Dahoui, M.; Lang, S. T. K.; McNally, T.; Mogensen, K. S.; Pappenberger, F.; Prates, F.; Rabier, F.; Richardson, D. S.; Vitart, F.; Malardel, S. (March 2019). "ECMWF Activities for Improved Hurricane Forecasts". Bulletin of the American Meteorological Society. 100 (3): 445–458. Bibcode:2019BAMS..100..445M. doi:10.1175/BAMS-D-18-0044.1.
- Ben Bouallègue, Zied; Clare, Mariana C. A.; Magnusson, Linus; Gascón, Estibaliz; Maier-Gerber, Michael; Janoušek, Martin; Rodwell, Mark; Pinault, Florian; Dramsch, Jesper S.; Lang, Simon T. K.; Raoult, Baudouin; Rabier, Florence; Chevallier, Matthieu; Sandu, Irina; Dueben, Peter; Chantry, Matthew; Pappenberger, Florian (June 2024). "The Rise of Data-Driven Weather Forecasting: A First Statistical Assessment of Machine Learning–Based Weather Forecasts in an Operational-Like Context". Bulletin of the American Meteorological Society. 105 (6): E864–E883. arXiv:2307.10128. doi:10.1175/BAMS-D-23-0162.1.
