= Thomas Keig =

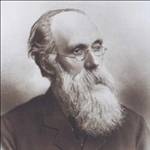
- Thomas Keig portrait
- Occupation: Photographer
- Known for: Becoming the first Mayor of Douglas

Thomas Keig was born on the Isle of Man in 1829. He was the founder of Keigs Photography, and was the first Mayor of the island's capital, Douglas, where he took office in 1896.

Keig was a "strong and influential" Methodist. A teacher, philanthropist, an early photographer by profession, and an astronomer by passion.

== Astronomy ==
Keig dedicated a significant portion of his life to the study of astronomy. His passion for the subject led to accomplishments including his acceptance as a Fellow of the Royal Astronomical Society and the Royal Meteorological Society. Furthermore, he established the Manx Astronomical Society in 1887, furthering the pursuit of astronomy on the Isle of Man. As per his commitment to advancing astronomical knowledge, he designed and constructed an observatory and telescope atop his own house, enabling him to conduct independent research and validate theories through his personal investigations.

== Passing and commemoration ==
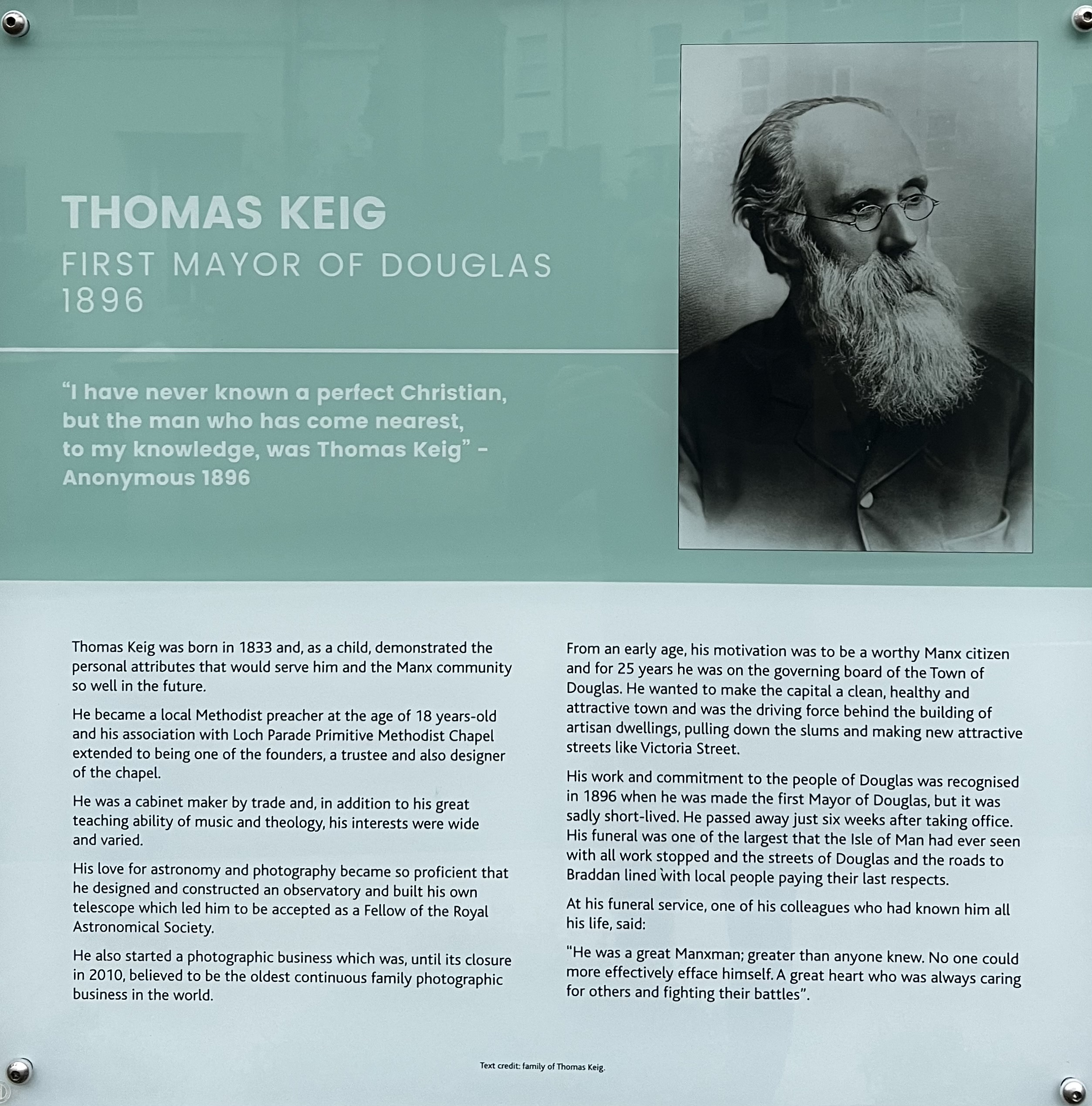
The plaque in commemoration of Thomas Keig, outside of "Thomas Keig Apartments" in Douglas

Keig died soon after taking office as the first Mayor of Douglas on 20 January 1896, after a short illness. His funeral was one of the largest the Island had ever seen. All work was ceased, and the streets of Douglas and the roads to Braddan were lined with spectators who had come from all parts of the Island to pay their respects. More recently a building and a street in Douglas have been named in his memory.
