= Antje Weisheimer =

German climate scientist

- Education: University of Potsdam
- Scientific career
- Fields: Climate Science, Meteorology
- Workplaces: University of Oxford, European Centre for Medium-Range Weather Forecasts
- Thesis: (2000)

Antje Weisheimer is a German climate scientist researching at the University of Oxford, UK, and the European Centre for Medium-Range Weather Forecasts, Reading, UK.

== Life ==
Weisheimer received her PhD in 2000 from the Department of Atmospheric Physics of the University of Potsdam. In 2002 to 2003 she was a Marie Curie fellow at the London School of Economics and Political Sciences. Weisheimer was an assistant professor at the Institute of Meteorology within the Freie Universität Berlin from 2003 to 2005 before changing to the European Centre for Medium-Range Weather Forecasts, Reading, UK. Since 2011 she additionally works half-time at the University of Oxford where she is a Senior Research Fellow of the National Centre for Atmospheric Science (NCAS) and a Research Fellow of Wolfson College. Weisheimer has a husband and two daughters.

== Work ==
Weisheimer’s research focuses on model-based weather and climate forecasts and the associated uncertainties. This includes research on the predictability on sub-seasonal, seasonal and decadal time scales, as well as the edge between weather and climate forecasts.

On the basis of climate model data, Weisheimer and her collaborators could determine the effect of human-induced climate change on the winter floods in England in 2013/14.

Weisheimer was a Contributing Author to the Fourth Assessment Report of the Intergovernmental Panel on Climate Change (IPCC) which was published in 2007 and an Expert Reviewer for the Fifth Assessment Report published in 2014.

She is an Editorial Member of Scientific Reports and co-editor of the Quarterly Journal of the Royal Meteorological Society.

== Awards ==
- 2011: Finalist for the L'Oreal Women in Science Award
- 2011: Shortlist for the Science of Risk Prize

== Selected Publication ==
- Sarah Ineson, Magdalena A. Balmaseda, Antje Weisheimer u. a. (2018). Predicting El Niño in 2014 and 2015. Scientific Reports, 8(1), 10733. https://doi.org/10.1038/s41598-018-29130-1
- Nathalie Schaller, Antje Weisheimer, Myles R. Allen u. a. (2016). Human influence on climate in the 2014 Southern England winter floods and their impacts. Nature Climate Change, 6(6), 627. https://doi.org/10.1038/nclimate2927
- Antje Weisheimer, Francisco J. Doblas-Reyes, Thomas Jung, T. N. Palmer (2011). On the predictability of the extreme summer 2003 over Europe. Geophysical Research Letters, 38(5). https://doi.org/10.1029/2010GL046455
