= Bogataj =

Bogataj is a Slovene surname. Notable people with the surname include:

- Jure Bogataj (born 1985), Slovene ski jumper
- Lučka Kajfež Bogataj (born 1957), Slovene climatologist
- Urša Bogataj (born 1995), Slovene ski jumper
- Vinko Bogataj (born 1948), Slovene ski jumper
