= Frank Marzano =

Frank Silvio Marzano (Jersey City, N.J., USA, 1963 - Rome, Italy, 2022) was a professor at the Sapienza University of Rome, Italy who was named Fellow of the Institute of Electrical and Electronics Engineers (IEEE) in 2016 for contributions to microwave remote sensing in meteorology and volcanology. He was also a Fellow of the UK Royal Meteorological Society since 2012. In 2020 Marzano was inserted in the World's Top 2% Scientists database of Stanford University (USA).

Dr. Frank S. Marzano received the Laurea degree (cum laude) in electronic engineering (1988) and the Ph.D. degree (1993) in applied electromagnetics both from the Sapienza University of Rome, Italy. After being a researcher of the Italian National Research Council (CNR) and Italian Space Agency (ASI) as well as a lecturer at the University of Perugia, Italy, in 1997 he joined the Department of Electrical Engineering and in 2001 co-founded the Center of Excellence CETEMPS, University of L’Aquila, Italy. In 2005 he joined the Dept. of Electronic Engineering (now Dept. of Information Engineering, Electronics and Telecommunication, DIET), Sapienza University of Rome, Italy where he is full professor and presently teaches courses on antenna theory, electromagnetic propagation and remote sensing. Since 2007 he has also been vice-director and in 2013 he became Director of the research center CETEMPS, University of L’Aquila, Italy. Since 2013 he has been the chair of the Electronic Engineering bachelor and master programs of the Sapienza University of Rome and since 2018 the vice-chair of the Master program (Laurea Magistrale) in Atmospheric Science and Technology (LMAST), a joint MSc program between Sapienza University of Rome and University of L'Aquila. Since 2017 he is also the chair of IEEE Geoscience and Remote Sensing Chapter of Central-North Italy (GRS29-CNI).

The research of Dr. Frank S. Marzano, published in more than 200 peer-reviewed papers, concerns passive and active remote sensing of the atmosphere from ground-based, airborne, and spaceborne platforms, development of inversion methods, radiative transfer modeling of scattering media as well as radar meteorology and microwave volcanology from ground and space. He is also involved on radiopropagation and optical propagation topics in relation to incoherent wave modeling, scintillation prediction, free space optics and rain fading analysis along terrestrial and satellite links for deep space. Dr. Marzano has published more than 150 papers on international refereed journals, 30 book chapters and more than 350 extended abstracts in conference proceedings. He co-edited a book on satellite remote sensing and ground-based remote sensing for Springer-Verlag (Berlin, Germany) in 2002 and 2010. He is a reviewer for the major international journals in remote sensing, geoscience and propagation. Since 2004 till 2013 he has been acting as an Associated Editor of IEEE Geoscience Remote Sensing Letters (GRSL) and in 2014 he became Associated Editor of IEEE Geoscience Remote Sensing; since 2011 he is also Associate Editor of EGU Atmospheric Measurement Techniques (AMT) journal. In 2005 and 2007 he has been Guest Co-Editor of the MicroRad04 and MicroRad06 Special Issues for IEEE Trans. Geosci. Rem. Sensing. He is also co-author of a university textbook on antennas and electromagnetic radiation, edited in Italian by Carocci (Roma, Italy) on 2011.

Dr. Frank S. Marzano received in 1993 the Young Scientist Award of XXIV General Assembly of URSI (Osaka, Japan). In 1998 he was the recipient of the ARPAD award from the Naval Research Laboratory (NRL, Washington, DC, USA), whereas in 2008 and 2011 he received the Best Paper Award from the EGU-Plinius Conferences in Nicosia (Cyprus) and Savona (Italy), respectively, and in 2009 the Best Oral Paper Award on propagation from the EuCAP Conference (Berlin, Germany). Within 2001-2005 he was the Italian national delegate for the European COST actions] n. 720 and n. 280; since 2008 he is the national delegate for the 5-year European COST Action project ES702 “EGCliMet” and COST Action project IC0802 “PropTNEO”. Since 2010 he is a member of the European Volcanic Ash Cloud Expert Group (EVACEG) and since 2011 he is the national vice-delegate for the 5-year European COST Action project IC1101 “OpticWISE” and co-chairman of its physical modeling working group. In 2009 he became a member of the Science team of the Global Precipitation Mission (GPM) and in 2012 he has been nominated member of EuMetSat Precipitation Science Advisory Group (P-SAG) and in 2014 EuMetSat MWI-ICI Radiometry SAG.
