= Stephen Thorpe =

Oceanographer

Stephen Austen Thorpe FRS is a British oceanographer, Professor of Oceanography, University of Southampton, 1986–2003, now emeritus. He was elected a Fellow of the Royal Society in 1991 and was President of the Royal Meteorological Society.
