= Jabez Inwards =

English lecturer and phrenologist (1817–1880)

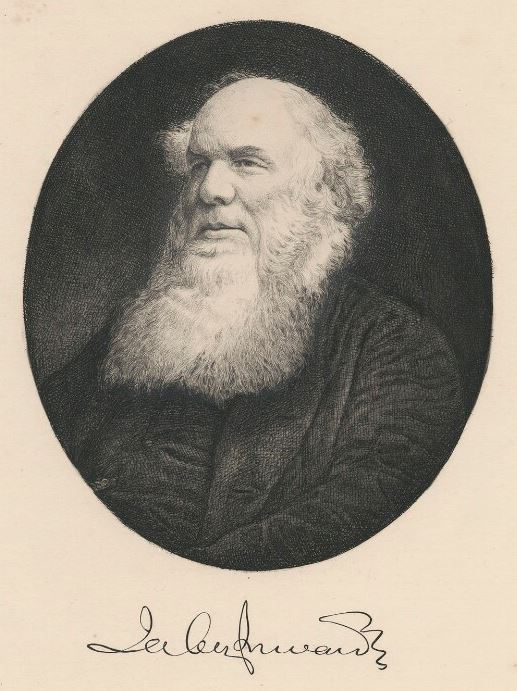
- Jabez Inwards by Charles William Sherborn, etching, published 1881, National Portrait Gallery
- Born: 23 April 1817; Houghton Regis, Bedfordshire, England
- Died: 21 December 1880 (aged 63); Kentish Town, London, England
- Resting place: Highgate Cemetery
- Occupations: Temperance lecturer and phrenologist

Jabez Inwards was a popular Victorian temperance lecturer and phrenologist.

== Life and career ==
The son of pious parents, Jabez Inwards had an imposing six foot tall figure with a large frame to match. Blessed with natural wit and an open disposition, he started his temperance career lecturing in the villages of Bedfordshire around Houghton Regis, the towns of his birth. His eloquence and fluency of speech in proclaiming and defending total abstinence proved to be very persuasive and his reputation spread beyond his neighbourhood.

In 1855 he moved to London with his family, where his services were much in demand at temperance gatherings. He also gave lectures on phrenology, astronomy as well as preaching the Gospel and delivered lectures on life assurance, as a travelling agent of the British Equitable Assurance Society. Over a thirty year period his diaries show that he delivered an average of four addresses a week. He also wrote several books and published texts of his lectures.

Inwards was a vegan, contributing to the monthly The Journal of Health & Phrenological Magazine published by fellow teetotaler and phrenologist William Horsell.

== Personal life and death ==
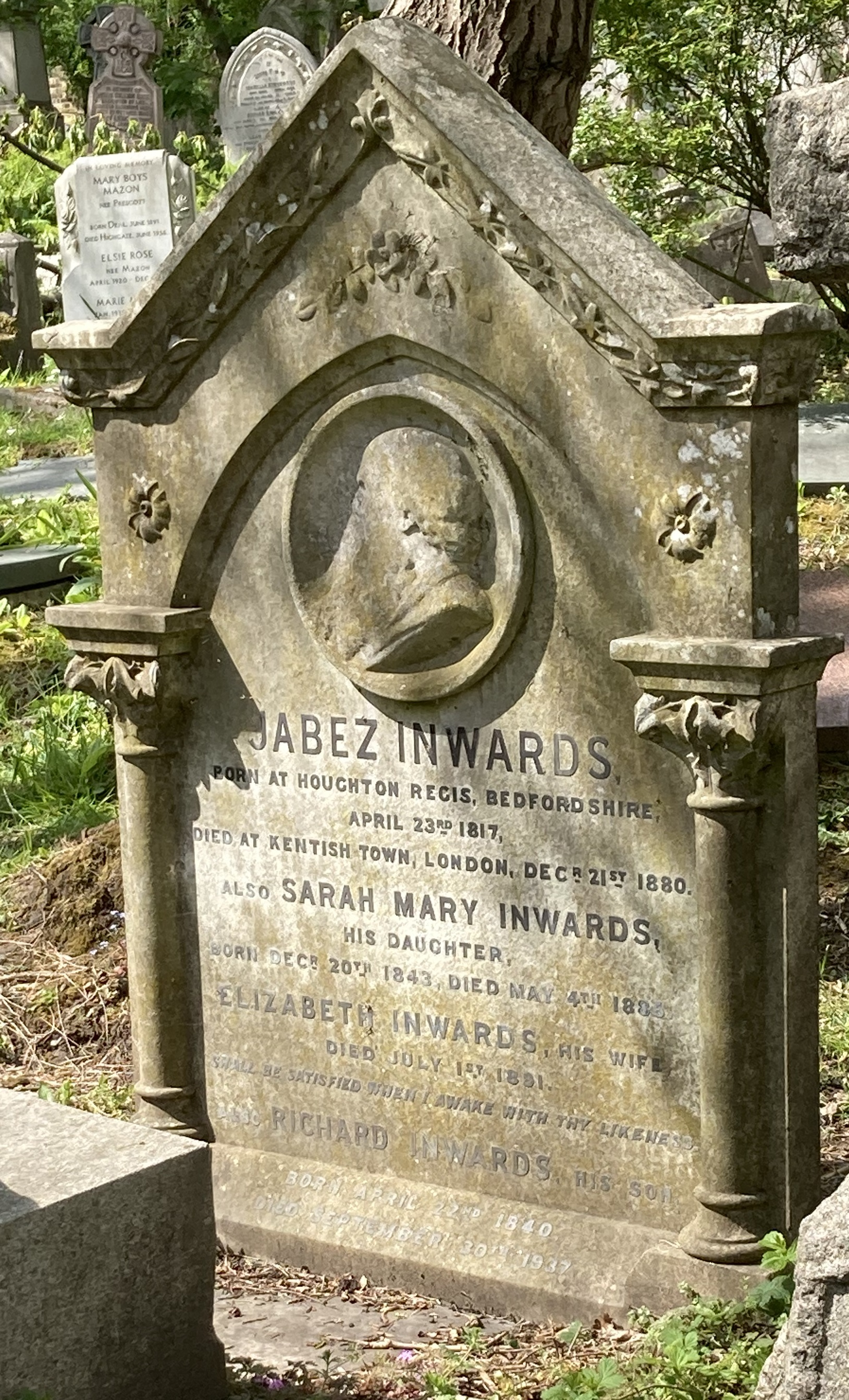
Family grave of Jabez Inwards in Highgate Cemetery

He married Elizabeth Duncombe in 1837 and they had four children, one of whom was the mining engineer Richard Inwards. Jabez died at the family home, 20 Bartholemew Villas, Kentish Town on 21 December 1880 and was buried in a family grave on the east side of Highgate Cemetery.

In 1886 a drinking fountain to commemorate Jabez Inwards was erected at the junction of Royal College Street and Kentish Town Road. Standing over four metres (13 ft) high and surmounted with a granite urn, it was designed by the Metropolitan Free Drinking Fountain Association. The inscription read: "Erected by the Friends of Temperance to the memory of Jabez Inwards, born April 23, 1817; died at Kentish Town, December 21, 1880" and the unveiling ceremony was attended by least 3,000 people.

== Selected publications ==
- Essays on Temperance et caetera (1849)
- A Catechism for Teetotalers (1855)
- The Life and Labours of J. Inwards, together with copious extracts from his speeches, his essays on Bible Temperance, etc (1860)
- A Lecture on Public Speaking (1870)
- The Philosophy of Moderate Drinking (1873)
