= Lučka Kajfež Bogataj =

Slovenian climatologist

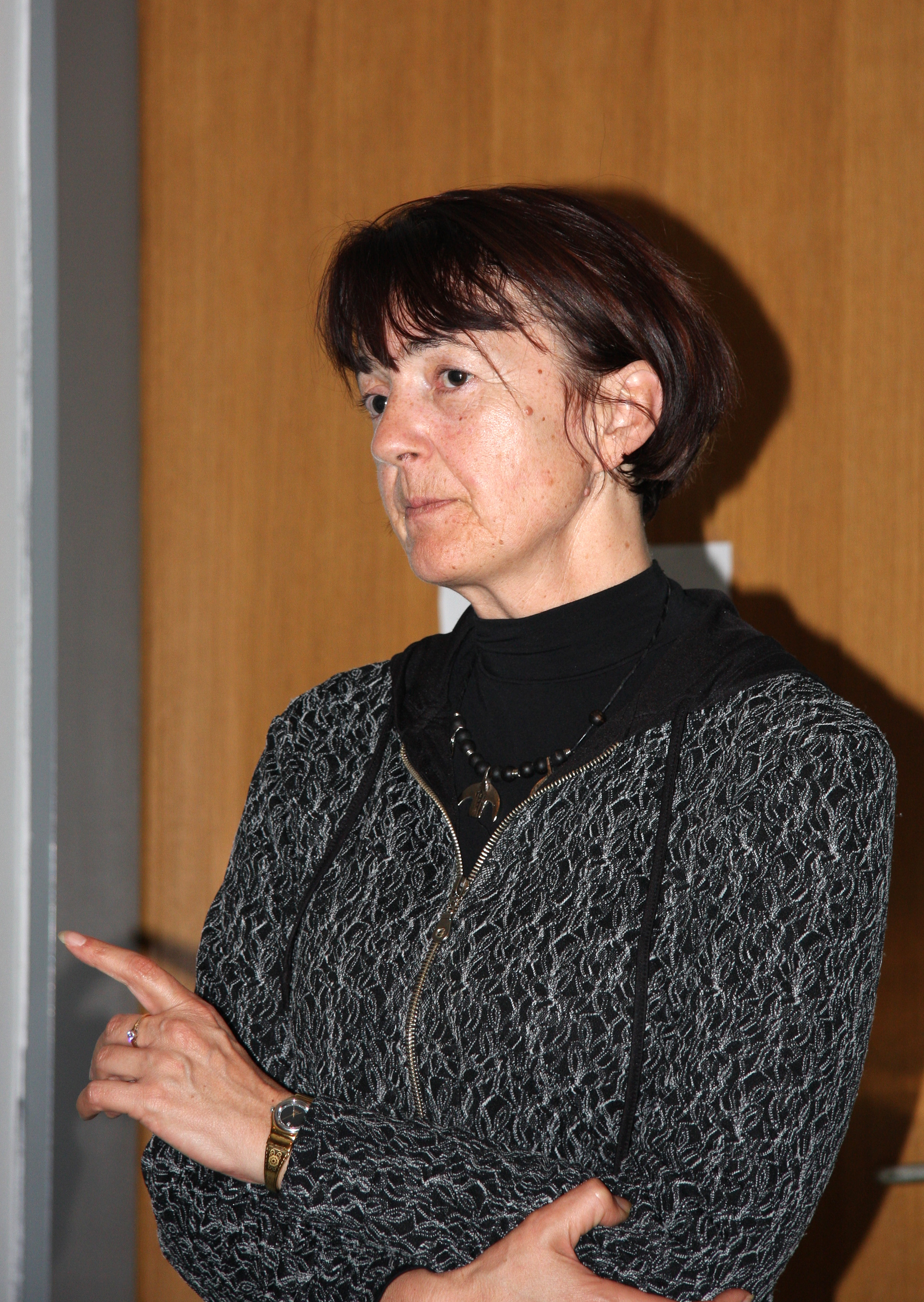
- Born: Lučka Kajfež Bogataj; 28 June 1957 (age 69); Slovenia
- Education: University of Ljubljana
- Occupation: Climatologist
- Years active: 1999–present
- Awards: Boris Kidrič Fund award (1988), Order for Merits (2008)

Lučka Kajfež Bogataj (born 28 June 1957) is a Slovenian climatologist, specialist in agricultural meteorology.

== Early life and education ==
She graduated in 1980 from the Ljubljana Faculty of Natural Sciences and Technology and received her doctorate from the Faculty of Biotechnology. She then pursued post-doctoral training in the U.S. and Sweden.

== Work experience ==
She is a researcher and professor at the University of Ljubljana, full professor at the Faculty of Biotechnology, and chair of the chair in Agrometeorology. She has been head of the Center for Biometrology at the Biotechnical Faculty since 1966. She also lectures at the Faculty of Mathematics and Physics as well as at the Faculty of Architecture. She is also a member of the educational committee of the European Meteorological Society. In her country she is considered one of the pioneers in the study of the impact of climate change, particularly on growth and agricultural production. Bogataj was named a member of the Intergovernmental Panel on Climate Change (IPCC) in Geneva and, in 2007, was vice-chair of Working Group II "Impacts, Adaptation and Vulnerability" in the preparation of the Fourth Assessment Report of the IPCC.

== Recognitions ==
In 2008, the then President of Slovenia, Danilo Türk, awarded her the Order of Merit for her scientific work on climate change and her dedication to protecting the environment. She was part of the IPCC group that in 2007, together with Albert Arnold (Al) Gore Jr, was awarded the Nobel Peace Prize for their efforts to build up and disseminate greater knowledge about man-made climate change. The University of Veracruz awarded Bogataj a medal for scientific merit in 2008. She also holds an honorary doctorate from the University of Primorska (2011), and was named in the group of women that inspire Europe in 2012.
