= Paul Mason (meteorologist) =

British meteorologist (born 1946)

Paul James Mason CB FRS (born 16 March 1946) is a British meteorologist, Emeritus Professor of Meteorology at the University of Reading.

He is a physicist who has carried out research in several areas of geophysical fluid dynamics and dynamical meteorology. Most recently he has carried out theoretical and numerical studies of the influence of topography on turbulent boundary layer flow.

He was President of the Royal Meteorological Society from 1992 to 1994. He was elected a Fellow of the Royal Society in 1995. He was awarded the Mason Gold Medal of the Royal Meteorological Society in 2005.
