= Henry Newton Dickson =

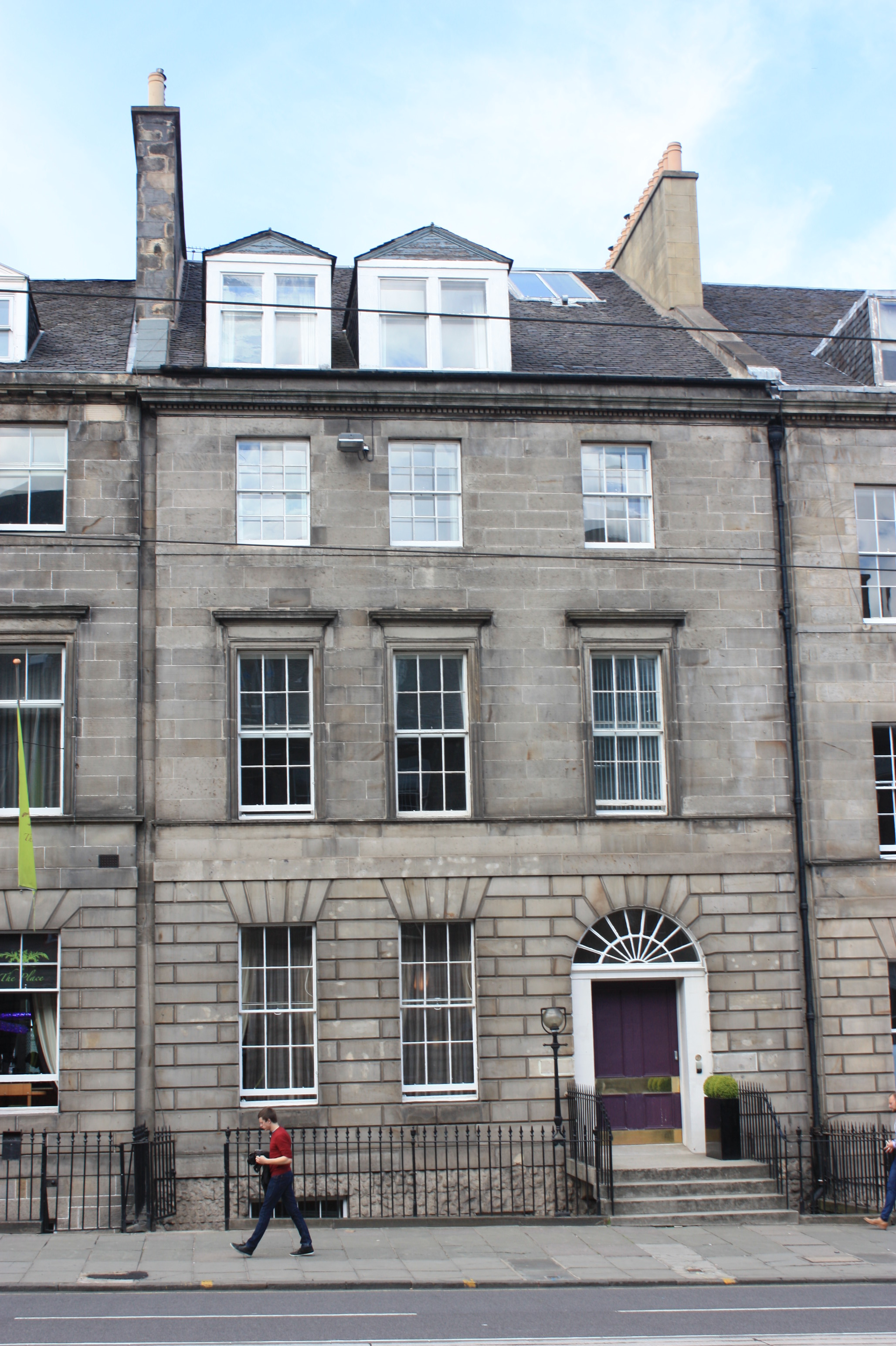
38 York Place, Edinburgh: the childhood home of H N Dickson

Henry Newton Dickson CBE FRSE FRGS (24 June 1866 – 2 April 1922) was a Scottish geographer, meteorologist and oceanographer from Edinburgh.

He was involved in the later phases of the deciphering of the masses of data from the Challenger expedition whose final findings were not published until 1895.

== Biography ==
He was born in Edinburgh on 24 June 1866 the son of William Dickson FRSE (1817-1889), a paper manufacturer with James Dickson & Co. He was raised at the family home at 38 York Place in the New Town, an elegant Georgian townhouse. His early education was at the Edinburgh Collegiate School.

Dickson studied at the University of Edinburgh under P. G. Tait and G. Chrystal. He received an M.A. and a D.Sc. from the University of Oxford, where he had learnt much from the eminent geographer, Halford Mackinder.

In 1888, aged only 21, he was elected a Fellow of the Royal Society of Edinburgh, one of the youngest Fellows ever elected. His proposers were Peter Guthrie Tait, Sir John Murray, Alexander Buchan and George Chrystal.

From 1906 to 1920 he was a professor of geography at University College, Reading. During the First World War he was seconded as Head of the Geographical Section, to the Naval Intelligence Division of the Admiralty. He was President of the Royal Meteorological Society in 1911–1912 and President of Section E (Geography and Ethnology) of the British Association in 1913.

He died in Edinburgh on 2 April 1922.

== Family ==
Dickson married Margaret Stephenson in 1891.

== Selected works ==
- Meteorology: the elements of weather and climate, 1893
- Climate and weather, 1912
- Handbook to Arabia (1916) (as part of Naval Intelligence)
