= Meteorological Applications =

- Discipline: Meteorology
- Language: English
- Edited by: Cristina Charlton-Perez and Dino Zardi

Publication details
- History: 1994-present
- Publisher: Wiley-Blackwell on behalf of the Royal Meteorological Society
- Frequency: Quarterly
- Impact factor: 2.5 (2024)

Standard abbreviations
- ISO 4: Meteorol. Appl.

Indexing
- ISSN: 1469-8080
- LCCN: 95660939
- OCLC no.: 195963622

Links
- Journal homepage

Meteorological Applications is a quarterly peer-reviewed scientific journal of meteorology established in 1994. It is published by John Wiley & Sons on behalf of the Royal Meteorological Society.

== Abstracting and indexing ==
The journal is abstracted and indexed in Current Contents/Physical, Chemical & Earth Sciences and in the Science Citation Index Expanded, among others. According to the Journal Citation Reports, the journal has a 2024 impact factor of 2.5.
