= Richard Inwards =

Mining engineer, astronomer, and meteorologist

Richard Inwards (22 April 1840, Houghton Regis – 30 September 1937, London) was a mining engineer, astronomer and meteorologist.

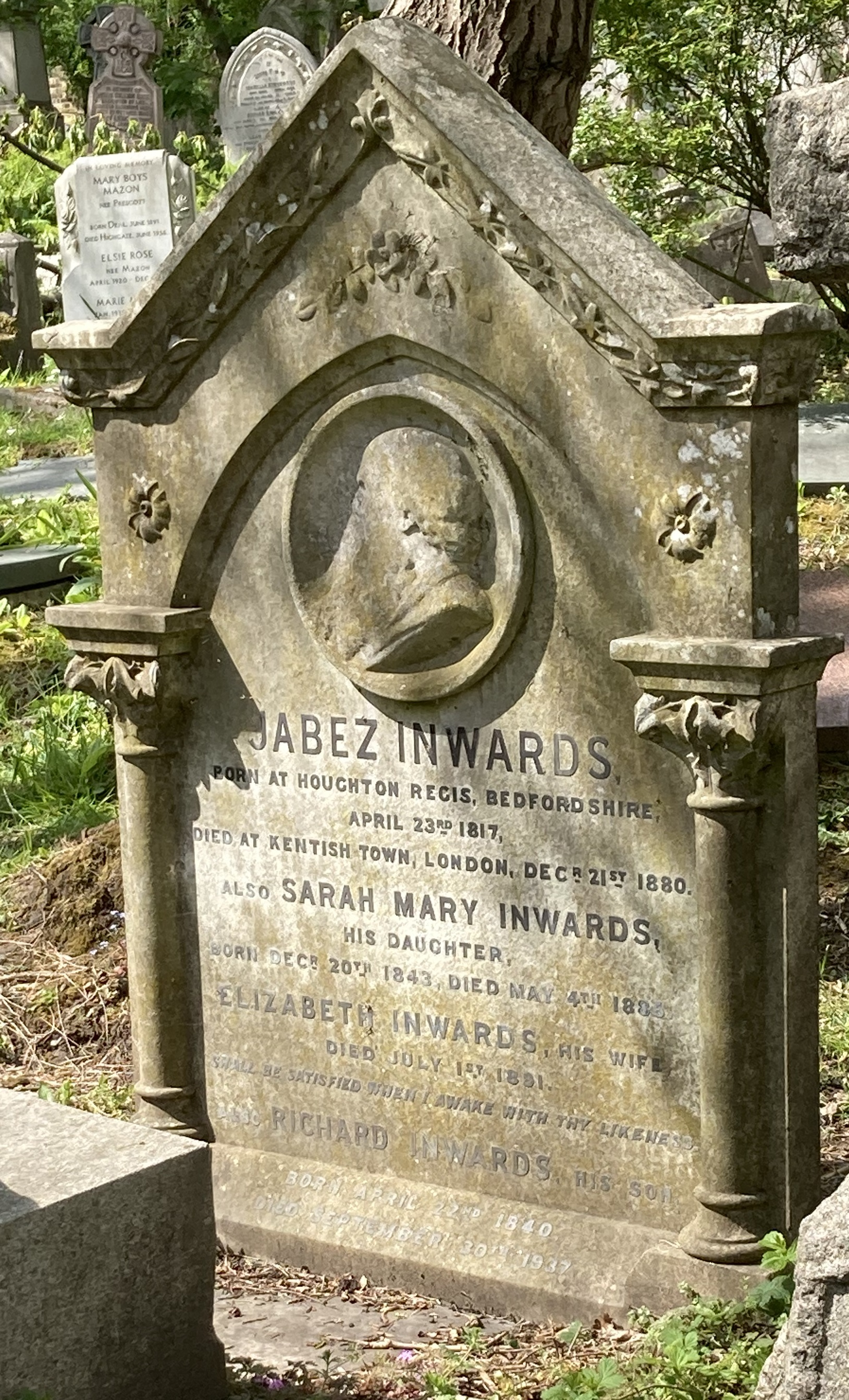
Inwards family grave in Highgate Cemetery

Inwards managed the San Baldomero mine in Bolivia for Evans and Askin and then a mine in Spain for the Manganese Company. He reported on mines and mining projects in South America, Mexico, Norway, Austria, Spain, Portugal and England. He was a Fellow of the Royal Astronomical Society (elected 8 February 1861) and a Fellow of the Royal Meteorological Society (elected 19 March 1862). He served as president of the Royal Meteorological Society in 1894 and 1895.

His father was the temperance lecturer Jabez Inwards. He died in 1937 at the age of 97 and was buried in the family grave at Highgate Cemetery.

== Selected works ==
- Weather lore. 1869.; 3rd edition. 1898.
- Temple of the Andes. 1884.
- William Ford Stanley: his life and work. 1911.
