= Weather (journal) =

Peer-reviewed academic journal

- Discipline: Atmospheric science
- Language: English
- Edited by: Ben Maybee, Regan Mudhar

Publication details
- History: 1946-present
- Publisher: John Wiley & Sons on behalf of the Royal Meteorological Society
- Frequency: Monthly
- Open access: Hybrid open-access journal
- Impact factor: 2.2 (2025)

Standard abbreviations
- ISO 4: Weather

Indexing
- ISSN: 0043-1656 (print); 1477-8696 (web)
- OCLC no.: 60638378

Links
- Journal homepage; Online access; Online archive

Weather is a monthly peer-reviewed scientific journal covering the atmospheric sciences. It was established in 1946 and is published by John Wiley & Sons on behalf of the Royal Meteorological Society, of which it is the "house journal". The editors-in-chief are Ben Maybee (University of Leeds) and Regan Mudhar (University of Lausanne).

== History ==
The journal was established in May 1946 with a foreword by the society president, Gordon Manley; it has been published monthly ever since. Manley noted the increasing number of people who make interest in the weather their hobby, or have a professional interest, such as farmers and seamen. He commented that:

"The Society accordingly has decided that the increasingly widespread interest in the science of weather manifest in an air age justifies the production of a new monthly magazine for the exchange and dissemination of information by means of articles, notes and correspondence. It is hoped with the aid of this magazine to reach not only the many Fellows who have expressed a desire for comments on current events, but also the wider public which nowadays increasingly demands some subject of universal interest as a recreation for the mind."

Initially a black-and-white publication, it has been printed in colour with an A4 format since 2004, with photographs of clouds and satellite images forming an integral part. It is now available online through the publisher.

== Abstracting and indexing ==
The journal is abstracted and indexed in:

- CAB Abstracts
- Current Contents/Physical, Chemical & Earth Sciences
- EBSCO databases
- GEOBASE
- Inspec
- ProQuest databases
- Science Citation Index Expanded
- Scopus

According to the Journal Citation Reports, the journal has a 2025 impact factor of 2.2.
