= Quarterly Journal of the Royal Meteorological Society =

- Discipline: Meteorology
- Language: English
- Edited by: John Methven and Andrew N. Ross

Publication details
- Former name(s): Bibliography of Meteorological Literature
- History: 1871-present
- Publisher: Wiley-Blackwell on behalf of the Royal Meteorological Society
- Frequency: 8/year
- Impact factor: 7.237 (2021)

Standard abbreviations
- ISO 4: Q. J. R. Meteorol. Soc.

Indexing
- CODEN: QJRMAM
- ISSN: 0035-9009 (print); 1477-870X (web)
- LCCN: sf80001033
- OCLC no.: 270648634

Links
- Journal homepage; Online access; Online archive

The Quarterly Journal of the Royal Meteorological Society is a peer-reviewed scientific journal of meteorology published eight times per year. It was established in 1871 as Bibliography of Meteorological Literature, obtaining its current name in 1873. It is published by Wiley-Blackwell on behalf of the Royal Meteorological Society.

== Abstracting and indexing ==
The journal is abstracted and indexed in Current Contents/Physical, Chemical & Earth Sciences and the Science Citation Index. According to the Journal Citation Reports, the journal has a 2021 impact factor of 7.237, ranking it 11th out of 94 journals in the category "Meteorology & Atmospheric Sciences".
