= Liz Bentley =

British meteorologist (born 1968)

Liz Bentley FRMetS
- Born: Elizabeth Jane Walker; March 1968 (age 58); Huddersfield, West Yorkshire, England
- Education: Newcastle University (BSc); University of Manchester (PhD)
- Scientific career
- Fields: Meteorology
- Workplaces: Royal Meteorological Society; University of Reading; Ministry of Defence; Met Office; BBC Weather
- Thesis: Diffraction by cracks in anisotropic solids (1994)
- Website: www.rmets.org/metmatters/prof-liz-bentley-chief-executive-royal-meteorological-society

Liz Bentley (born March 1968) is a British meteorologist who is the chief executive at the Royal Meteorological Society and a Professor of Meteorology at the University of Reading.

== Early life and education ==
Bentley was born in Huddersfield and grew up in Yorkshire, which is where she first became interested in weather. She was particularly interested in the weather changes over the Pennines. She studied mathematics at Newcastle University graduating in 1990 before moving to the University of Manchester for graduate studies, where she researched the applied mathematics of ultrasonic testing for her PhD.

== Research and career ==
Bentley moved to Bracknell, where she joined the Met Office. She started training to become a meteorologist at the Met Office college. Her early work investigated weather forecasting for RAF Brize Norton, where she managed an outstation. She worked on both weather forecasting and prediction of noise. She was eventually appointed chief instructor at the Met Office college.

Bentley continued to work at the Met Office until 2002, when she moved to London as chief of the BBC Weather centre. She led the facility until 2006, when she joined the Ministry of Defence (MoD) where she oversaw environmental research. She imaged complex systems, including the ocean floor and outer space.

In 2008, Bentley moved to the Royal Meteorological Society. She established a public group known as The Weather Club, which looked to enhance public appreciation of weather-related phenomena. She created a regular magazine called The Weather to promote appreciation and understanding of the weather to people from all walks of life.

Bentley was appointed chief executive at the Royal Meteorological Society in 2013. She was appointed a visiting professor at the University of Reading in 2014.
