= European Meteorological Society =

- Abbreviation: EMS
- Established: 14 September 1999 (26 years ago)
- Founders: René Morin, Werner Wehry, Jon Wieringa
- Founded at: Norrköping
- Types: learned society
- Aim: Promote and popularize atmospheric and climate sciences. Bring together stakeholders in the field.
- Headquarters: Berlin
- Chairpersons: Liz Bentley
- Website: www.emetsoc.org

The European Meteorological Society (EMS) is an association whose members include 38 meteorological societies from European countries and 30 associate members (meteorological services, international organizations and commercial companies). It was founded in 1999 under the leadership of the Secretary General of Meteorology and Climate Change, to extend the integration and coordination efforts already undertaken at the European level by meteorological services with the European Centre for Medium-Range Weather Forecasts (ECMWF), the European Organisation for the Exploitation of Meteorological Satellites (EUMETSAT) and EUMETNET.

== History ==
At the first European Conference on the Applications of Meteorology (ECAM) in Oxford, UK, in 1993, members of national meteorological societies established contacts and at the following ECAM in Lindau, Germany, they decided to create a European Meteorological Society (EMS). A first newsletter of the future the EMS was published in 1996 with short profiles, reports on current activities, and contact addresses of national meteorological societies in Europe. promoting an organization of societies rather than an organization of individuals.

A working group examined the objectives, funding, organization, statutes, and other issues meeting at a conference of the Deutsche Meteorologische Gesellschaft (DMG) in Leipzig in September 1998, convened by René Morin (Société Météorologique de France), Werner Wehry (DMG), and Jon Wieringa (Nederlandse Vereniging ter Bevordering van Meteorologie). They were joined by Stan Cornford (Royal Meteorological Society - RMetS), Fritz Neuwirth (Österreichische Gesellschaft für Meteorologie), Hans Richner (Schweizerische Gesellschaft für Meteorologie), Gerd Tetzlaff (DMG), and Arne Spekat.

Agreement was reached on a few basic points: the working language of the future EMS would be English, but the basic documents would also be available in German and French translations, particularly for legal purposes. Europe was defined as the area of the Sixth WMO Regional Association. Agreement was then reached on the composition and mission of the society: an association of European societies, mainly at national level, with a scientific basis in the fields of meteorology and related sciences, and their applications.

After the Leipzig conference, the text of the agreement was circulated to all interested societies, and the responses to the comments were summarized by Morin and recirculated for further comment. The founding meeting of the EMS was on September 14, 1999, at the ECAM meeting in Norrköping, Sweden. The draft Constitution was formally accepted by the 21 societies initially present. These were the national societies of Austria, Croatia, Denmark, Finland, France, Germany, Greece, Hungary, Iceland, and Italy (two societies, one formed by the merger of three former societies), the Netherlands, Portugal, Romania, Slovakia, Slovenia, Spain, Sweden, Switzerland, and the United Kingdom.

The first annual meeting of the society took place in 2001 at the 5th European Conference on Applications of Meteorology in Budapest, organized as a conference and a roundtable discussion on the future of meteorology. Since 2004, the format of the annual meeting has been a conference with the European Conference on Applications of Meteorology (ECAM). EUMETNET RSCE, now the EUMETNET Climate Programme, became a partner in organizing.

== Members ==
The EMS has 38 member meteorological societies from all European countries and some regional ones such as Catalonia. These societies have a membership of over 10,000 members.

It also includes 31 associate members, which are non-European meteorological societies, EUMETNET national meteorological and hydrological services, research and educational institutes and departments, companies with an interest in meteorology, related sciences, and their applications, as well as European organizations with similar interests.
