= Robert James Mann =

English physician and science writer

Robert James Mann (5 January 1817 – 8 August 1886) was an English physician and science writer.

== Life ==
The son of James Mann of Norwich, he was born there in 1817, and educated for the medical profession at University College London. At the hospital connected with the college he acted as dresser to Robert Liston. He practised for some years in Norfolk, first in Norwich, and then at Buxton. In 1853 he was in poor health, and he concentrate more on writing. In 1854 he graduated M.D. in the University of St. Andrews, and in 1857, on the invitation of John Colenso, he left England for Natal, where he stayed for nine years.

Two years after his arrival, Mann was appointed the first superintendent of education for Natal, and set up a system of primary education. He also took up meteorology. In 1866 he returned from Natal with an appointment from the legislative council as emigration agent for the colony; and for the rest of his life lived in or near London.

For three years Mann was president of the Meteorological Society, and for about a similar period one of the board of visitors of the Royal Institution. From 1874 to 1886 he acted as secretary to the African and the Foreign and Colonial sections of the Society of Arts. He was also member or fellow of the Astronomical, Geographical, Photographic, and other societies, and was involved in a number of international exhibitions.

Mann died at Wandsworth on 8 August 1886, and was buried at Kensal Green.

== Works ==
Mann was a noted scientific populariser. His first work, The Planetary and Stellar Universe (1845), was based on a course of lectures delivered to a provincial audience, and it was followed by a series of popular texts on astronomy, chemistry, physiology, and health. Major works were:

- The Book of Health, 1850.
- The Philosophy of Reproduction, 1850.
- Tennyson's "Maud" vindicated; an Explanatory Essay, 1850.
- A Guide to the Knowledge of the Heavens, designed for the use of Schools and Families., 1852.
- Lessons in General Knowledge, 1855–6.
- A Guide to the Knowledge of Life, 1858.
- A Guide to Astronomical Science, 1858,
- A Description of Natal, 1860.
- The Colony of Natal, 1860–2.
- Medicine for Emergencies, 1861.
- The Emigrant's Guide to Natal, 1868; 2nd ed. 1873.
- The Weather, 1877.
- Drink: Simple Lessons for Home Use, 1877.
- Domestic Economy and Household Science, 1878.
- The Zulus and Boers of South Africa, 1879.
- The Physical Properties of the Atmosphere, 1879.
- Familiar Lectures on the Physiology of Food and Drink, 1884.

Mann was also a contributor of scientific articles to periodicals, in particular the Edinburgh Review and Chambers's Journal. The Royal Society Catalogue of Scientific Papers had him as the author of 23 memoirs in scientific periodicals.

== Notes ==
Attribution

This article incorporates text from a publication now in the public domain: Lee, Sidney, ed. (1893). "Mann, Robert James". Dictionary of National Biography. Vol. 36. London: Smith, Elder & Co.
