= Royal Meteorological Society =

Learned society and open-access publisher

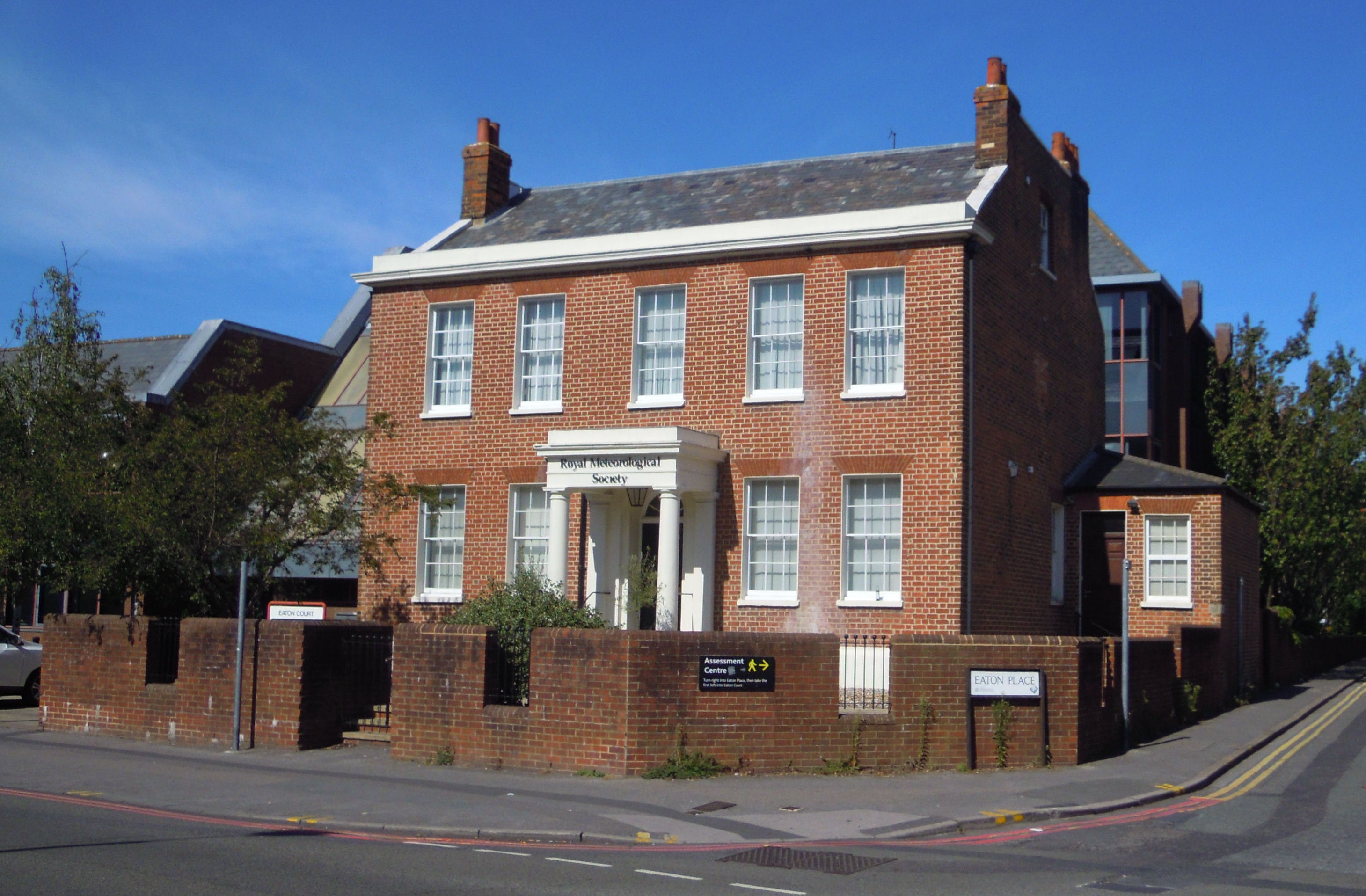
- Established: 3 April 1850 (176 years ago)
- Founders: John Lee, James Glaisher, Samuel Charles Whitbread
- Types: learned society, open-access publisher
- Headquarters: Reading
- Country: United Kingdom
- Coordinates: 51°27′19″N 0°58′50″W
- Membership: 3,162 (2020)
- Chairpersons: G. M. B. Dobson
- Affiliations: European Meteorological Society, Science Council, National Council for Voluntary Organisations, International Forum for Meteorological Societies
- Revenue: 1,444,217 pound sterling (2025)
- Employees: 22 (2025)
- Volunteers: 651 (2025)
- Website: www.rmets.org

The Royal Meteorological Society is an organization that promotes academic and public engagement in weather and climate science. Fellows of the Society must possess relevant qualifications, but Members can be lay enthusiasts. It publishes various journals, including the Quarterly Journal of the Royal Meteorological Society. The chief executive officer is Liz Bentley.

== Constitution ==
The Royal Meteorological Society traces its origins back to 3 April 1850 when the British Meteorological Society was formed as "a society the objects of which should be the advancement and extension of meteorological science by determining the laws of climate and of meteorological phenomena in general". Along with nine others, including James Glaisher, John Drew, Edward Joseph Lowe, The Revd Joseph Bancroft Reade, and Samuel Charles Whitbread, Dr John Lee, an astronomer, of Hartwell House, near Aylesbury, Buckinghamshire founded in the library of his house the British Meteorological Society, which became the Royal Meteorological Society. It became The Meteorological Society in 1866, when it was incorporated by Royal Charter, and the Royal Meteorological Society in 1883, when Her Majesty Queen Victoria granted the privilege of adding 'Royal' to the title. Along with 74 others, the famous meteorologist Luke Howard joined the original 15 members of the Society at its first ordinary meeting on 7 May 1850.

As of 2008 it has more than 3,000 members worldwide. The chief executive of the Society is Liz Bentley. Paul Hardaker was chief executive from 2006 to 2012.

== Membership ==
There are four membership categories:

- Honorary Fellow
- Fellow (FRMetS)
- Member
- Corporate member

== Awards ==
The society regularly awards a number of medal and prizes, of which the Symons Gold Medal (established in 1901) and the Mason Gold Medal (established in 2006) are pre-eminent. The two medals are awarded alternately.

Other awards include the Buchan Prize, the Hugh Robert Mill Award, the L F Richardson Prize, the Michael Hunt Award, the Fitzroy Prize, the Gordon Manley Weather Prize, the International Journal of Climatology Prize, the Society Outstanding Service Award and the Vaisala Award.

== Journals ==
The society has a number of regular publications:

- Atmospheric Science Letters: a monthly journal that provides a peer-reviewed publication route for new shorter contributions in the field of atmospheric and closely related sciences.
- Weather: a monthly journal with many full colour illustrations and photos for specialists and general readers with an interest in meteorology. It uses a minimum of mathematics and technical language.
- Quarterly Journal of the Royal Meteorological Society: one of the world's leading journals for meteorology, publishing original research in the atmospheric sciences. There are eight issues per year.
- Meteorological Applications: this is a journal for applied meteorologists, forecasters and users of meteorological services and has been published since 1994. It is aimed at a general readership and authors are asked to take this into account when preparing papers.
- International Journal of Climatology: has 15 issues a year and covers a broad spectrum of research in climatology.
- WIREs Climate Change: a journal about climate change
- Geoscience Data Journal: an online, open-access journal.
- Climate Resilience and Sustainability: an interdisciplinary, open-access journal.

All publications are available online but a subscription is required for some. However certain "classic" papers are freely available on the Society's website.

== Local centres and special interest groups ==
The society has several local centres across the UK.

There are also a number of special interest groups which organise meetings and other activities to facilitate exchange of information and views within specific areas of meteorology. These are informal groups of professionals interested in specific technical areas of the profession of meteorology. The groups are primarily a way of communicating at a specialist level.

== Presidents ==
- 1850–1853: Samuel Charles Whitbread, first time
- 1853–1855: George Leach
- 1855–1857: John Lee
- 1857–1858: Robert Stephenson
- 1859–1860: Thomas Sopwith
- 1861–1862: Nathaniel Beardmore
- 1863–1864: Robert Dundas Thomson, died in office
- 1864: Samuel Charles Whitbread, second time
- 1865–1866: Charles Brooke
- 1867–1868: James Glaisher
- 1869–1870: Charles Vincent Walker
- 1871–1872: John William Tripe
- 1873–1875: Robert James Mann
- 1876–1877: Henry Storks Eaton
- 1878–1879: Charles Greaves
- 1880–1881: George James Symons, first time
- 1882–1883: Sir John Knox Laughton
- 1884–1885: Robert Henry Scott
- 1886–1887: William Ellis
- 1888–1889: William Marcet
- 1890–1891: Baldwin Latham
- 1892–1893: Charles Theodore Williams, first time
- 1894–1895: Richard Inwards
- 1896–1897: Edward Mawley
- 1898–1899: Francis Campbell Bayard
- 1900: George James Symons, second time; died in office
- 1900: Charles Theodore Williams, second time
- 1901–1902: William Henry Dines
- 1903–1904: Captain Sir David W. Barker
- 1905–1906: Richard Bentley
- 1907–1908: Hugh Robert Mill
- 1910–1911: Henry Mellish
- 1911–1912: Henry Newton Dickson
- 1913–1914: Charles John Philip Cave, first time
- 1915–1917: Sir Henry George Lyons
- 1918–1919: Sir Napier Shaw
- 1920–1921: Reginald Hawthorn Hooker
- 1922–1923: Charles Chree
- 1924–1925: Charles John Philip Cave, second time
- 1926–1927: Sir Gilbert Walker
- 1928–1929: Richard Gregory
- 1930–1931: Rudolf Gustav Karl Lempfert
- 1932–1933: Sydney Chapman
- 1934–1935: Ernest Gold
- 1936–1937: Francis John Welsh Whipple
- 1938–1939: Sir Bernard A. Keen
- 1940–1941: Sir George Clarke Simpson
- 1942–1944: David Brunt
- 1945–1946: Gordon Manley
- 1947–1949: G. M. B. Dobson
- 1949–1951: Sir Robert Alexander Watson-Watt
- 1951–1953: Sir Charles Normand
- 1953–1955: Sir Graham Sutton
- 1955–1957: Reginald Sutcliffe
- 1957–1959: Percival Albert Sheppard
- 1959–1961: James Martin Stagg
- 1961–1963: Howard Latimer Penman
- 1963–1965: John Stanley Sawyer
- 1965–1967: G. D. Robinson
- 1967–1968: F. Kenneth Hare
- 1968–1970: John Mason
- 1970–1972: Frank Pasquill
- 1972–1974: Robert B. Pearce
- 1974–1976: Raymond Hide
- 1976–1978: John T. Houghton
- 1978–1980: John Monteith
- 1980–1982: Philip Goldsmith
- 1982–1984: Henry Charnock
- 1984–1986: Andrew Gilchrist
- 1986–1988: Richard S. Scorer
- 1988–1990: Keith Anthony Browning
- 1990–1992: Stephen Austen Thorpe
- 1992–1994: Paul James Mason
- 1994–1996: John E. Harries
- 1996–1998: David J. Carson
- 1998–2000: Sir Brian Hoskins
- 2000–2002: David Burridge
- 2002–2004: Howard Cattle
- 2004–2006: Chris Collier
- 2006–2008: Geraint Vaughan
- 2008–2010: Julia Slingo
- 2010–2012: Tim Palmer
- 2012–2014: Joanna Haigh
- 2014–2016: Jennie Campbell
- 2016–2018: Ellie Highwood
- 2018–2020: David Warrilow
- 2020–2022: David Griggs
- 2022–2023: Lesley Gray
- 2024: David Griggs
- 2024–2026: Brian Golding
- 2026- : Emily Shuckburgh

== Notable fellows ==
- John Farrah (1849–1907).

== See also ==
- List of atmospheric dispersion models
- UK Dispersion Modelling Bureau
- Met Office
