= Air pollution measurement =

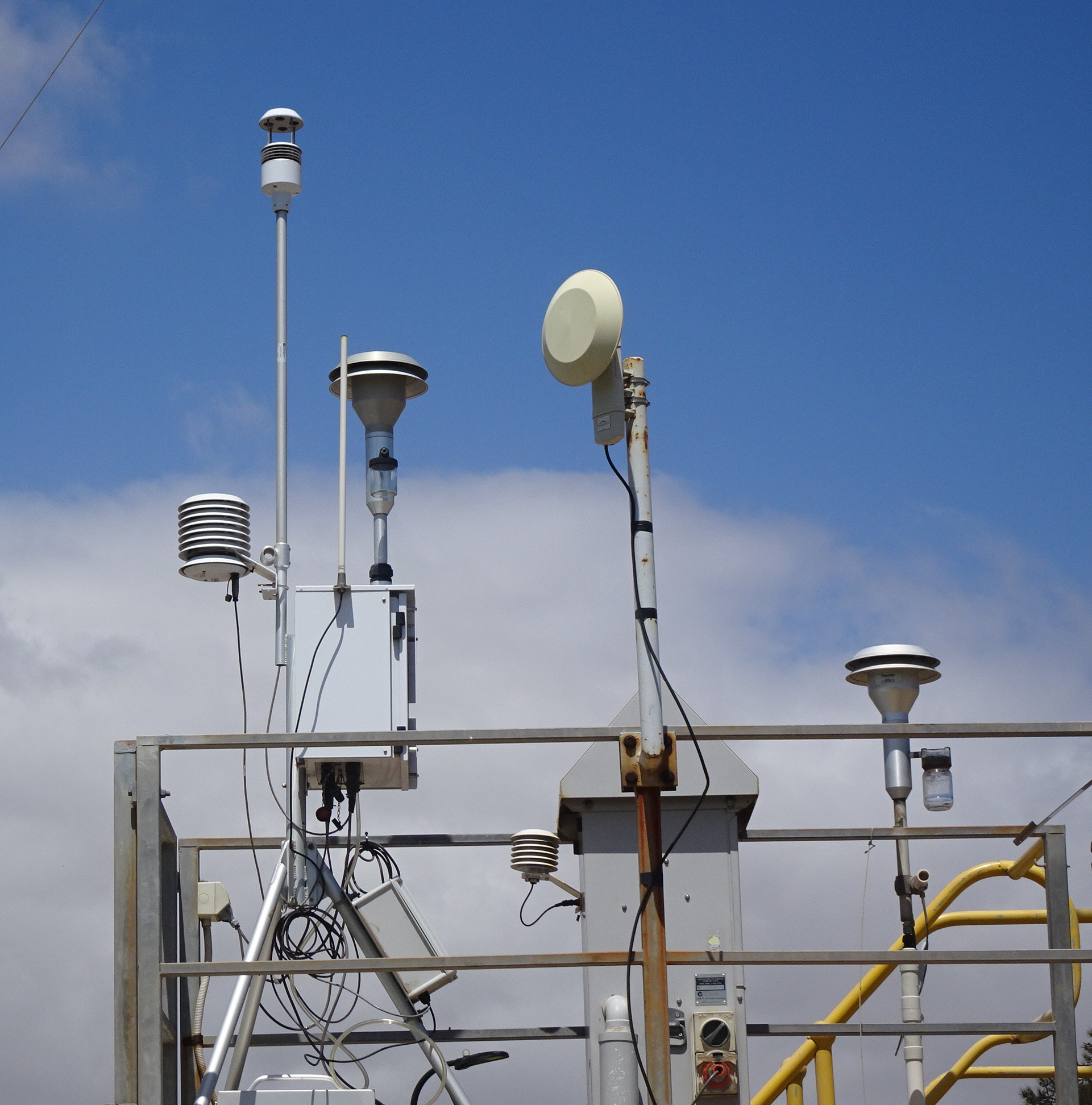
Air quality monitoring sensors in Port Pirie, South Australia

Air pollution measurement is the process of collecting and measuring the components of air pollution, notably gases and particulates. The earliest devices used to measure pollution include rain gauges (in studies of acid rain), Ringelmann charts for measuring smoke, and simple soot and dust collectors known as deposit gauges.

Modern air pollution measurement techniques characterize ambient air quality using data from three main sources: direct measurements of on site sources, computer models, and remote sensing platforms such as satellites. Air pollution measurement can be carried out using many different devices and techniques. These range from simple absorbent test tubes known as diffusion tubes through to highly sophisticated chemical and physical sensors that give near real-time pollution measurements, which are used to generate air quality indexes.

== Importance of measurement ==
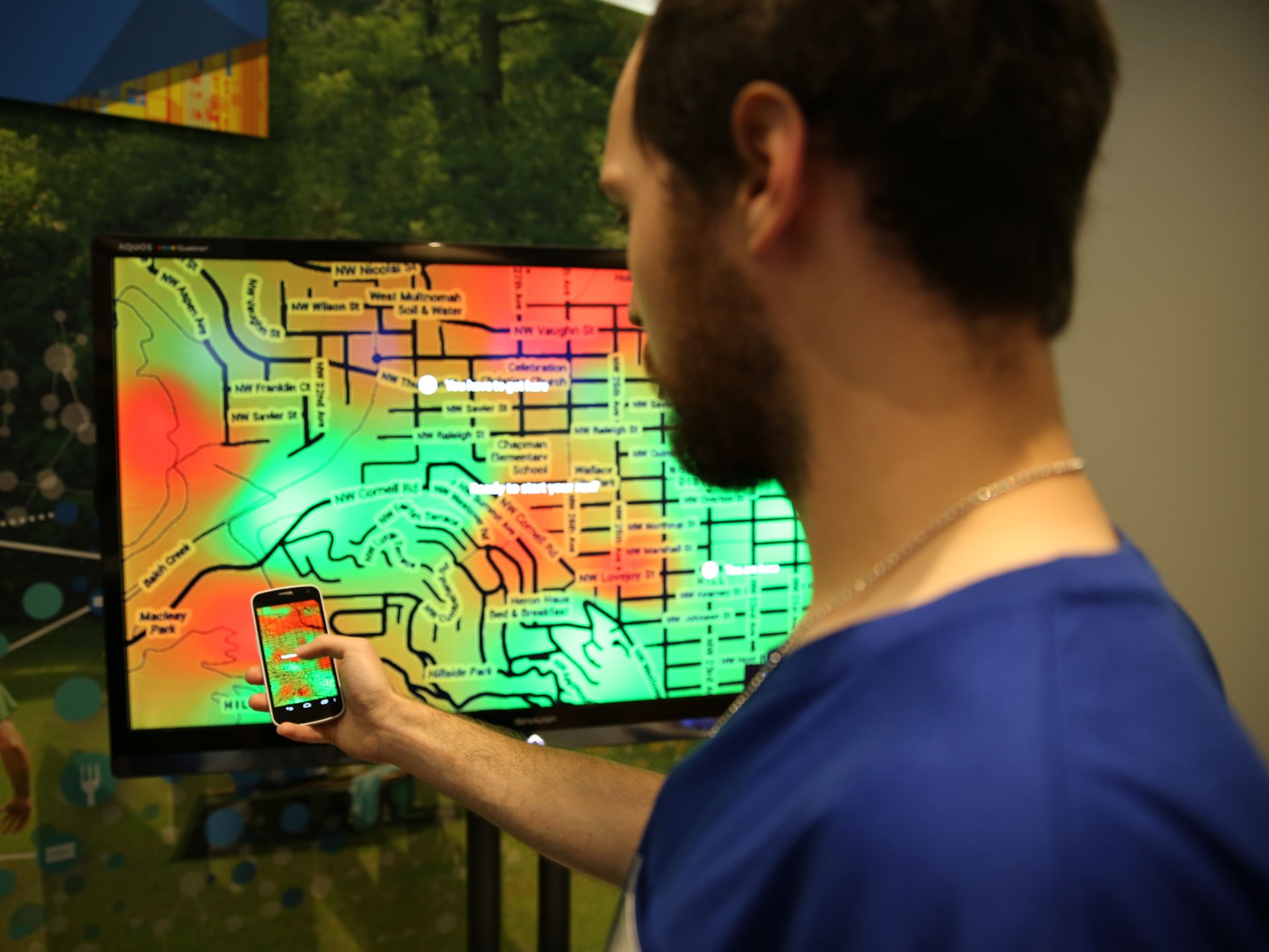
Smartphone apps, based on aggregated real-time air pollution measurements, can be used to find the least polluted routes through a city.

Air pollution is caused by many factors. In urban environments, pollution may include many components, notably solid and liquid particulates (such as soot from engines and fly ash escaping from incinerators), and numerous different gases (most commonly sulfur dioxide, nitrogen oxides, and carbon monoxide, all related to fuel combustion). These different forms of pollution have different effects on people's health, on the natural world (water, soil, crops, trees, and other vegetation), and on the built environment. Measuring air pollution is the first step in identifying its causes and then reducing or regulating them to keep the quality of the air inside legal limits (mandated by regulators such as the Environmental Protection Agency in the United States) or advisory guidelines suggested by bodies such as the World Health Organization (WHO). According to the WHO, over 6000 cities in 117 countries now routinely monitor the quality of their air.

== Types of measurement ==
Air pollution is (broadly) measured in two different ways, passively or actively.

=== Passive measurement ===
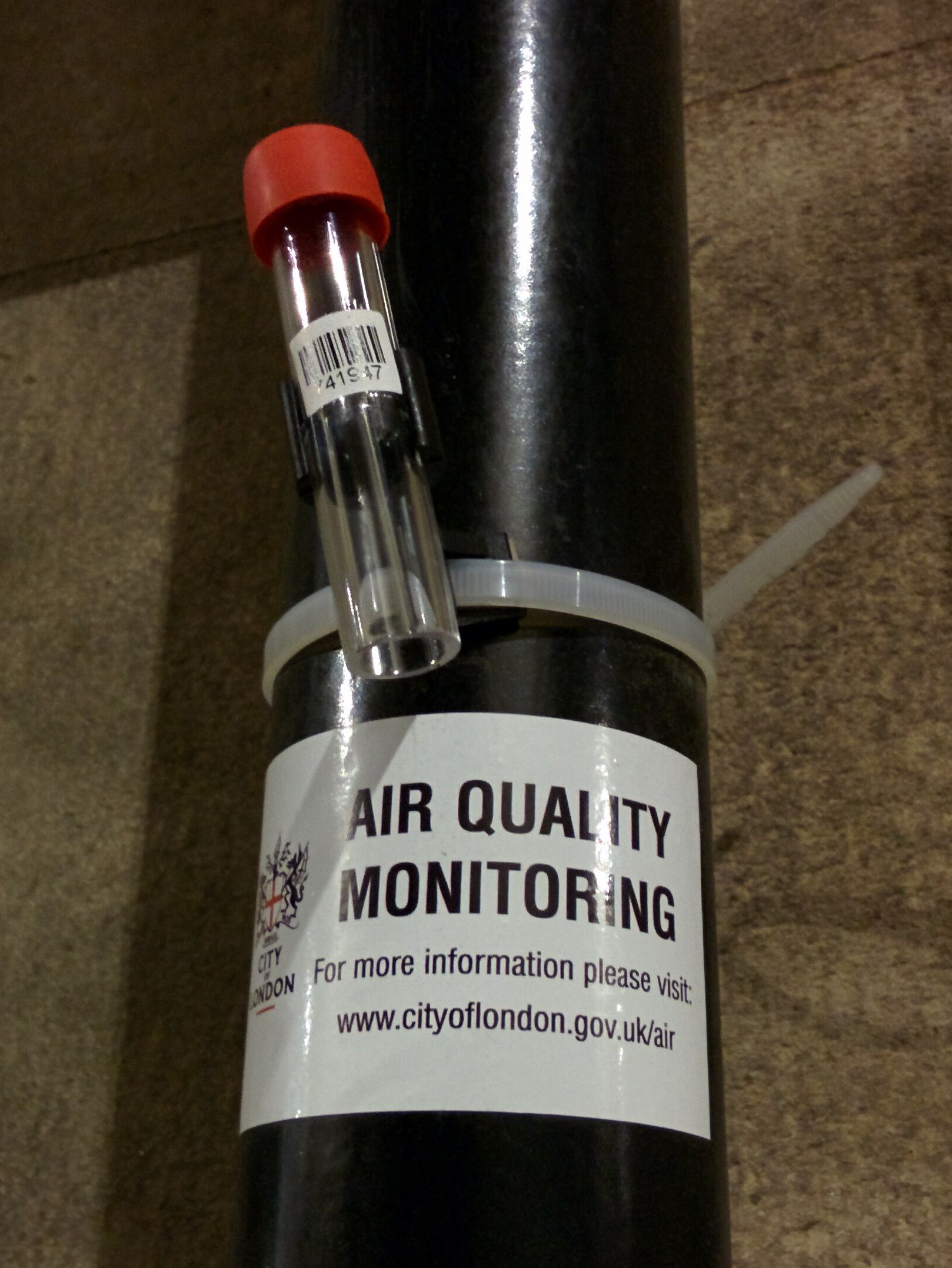
A diffusion tube is an example of a passive air pollution monitor.

Passive devices are relatively simple and low-cost. They work by soaking up or otherwise passively collecting a sample of the ambient air, which then has to be analyzed in a laboratory. One of the most common forms of passive measurement is the diffusion tube, which looks similar to a laboratory test tube and is fastened to something like a lamp post to absorb one or more specific pollutant gases of interest. After a period of time, the tube is taken down and sent to a laboratory for analysis. Deposit gauges, one of the oldest forms of pollution measurement, are another type of passive device. They are large funnels that collect soot or other particulates and drain them into sampling bottles, which, again have to be analyzed in a laboratory.

=== Active measurement ===
Active measurement devices are automated or semi-automated and tend to be more complex and sophisticated than passive devices, though they are not always more sensitive or reliable. They use fans to suck in the air, filter it, and either analyze it automatically there and then or collect and store it for later analysis in a laboratory. Active sensors use either physical or chemical methods. Physical methods measure an air sample without changing it, for example, by seeing how much of a certain wavelength of light it absorbs. Chemical methods change the sample in some way, through a chemical reaction, and measure that. Most automated air-quality sensors are examples of active measurement.

== Air quality sensors ==
Air quality sensors range from small handheld devices to large-scale static monitoring stations in urban areas, and remote monitoring devices used on aeroplanes and space satellites.

=== Personal air quality sensors ===
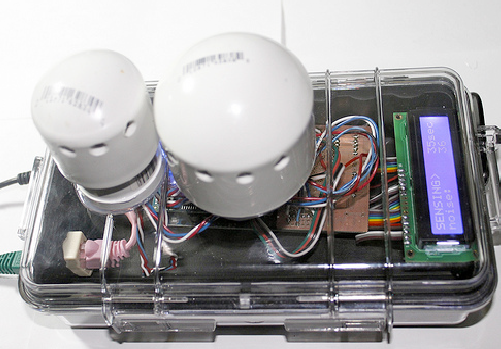
The Air Quality Egg is an example of a low-cost, personal air pollution sensor.

At one end of the scale, there are small, inexpensive portable (and sometimes wearable), Internet-connected air pollution sensors, such as the Air Quality Egg and PurpleAir. These constantly sample particulates and gases and produce moderately accurate, almost real-time measurements that can be analyzed by smartphone apps. Their data can also be used in a crowdsourced way, either alone or with other pollution data, to build up maps of pollution over wide areas. They can be used for both indoor and outdoor environments and the majority focus on measuring five common forms of air pollution: ozone, particulate matter, carbon monoxide, sulfur dioxide, and nitrogen dioxide. Some measure less common pollutants such as radon gas and formaldehyde.

Sensors like this were once expensive, but the 2010s saw a trend towards cheaper portable devices that can be worn by individuals to monitor their local air quality levels, which are now sometimes informally referred to as low-cost sensors (LCS). A recent review by the European Commission's Joint Research Center identified 112 examples, made by 77 different manufacturers.

Personal sensors can empower individuals and communities to better understand their exposure environments and risks from air pollution. For example, a research group led by William Griswold at UCSD handed out portable air pollution sensors to 16 commuters, and found "urban valleys" where buildings trapped pollution. The group also found that passengers in buses have higher exposures than those in cars.

=== Small-scale static pollution monitoring ===
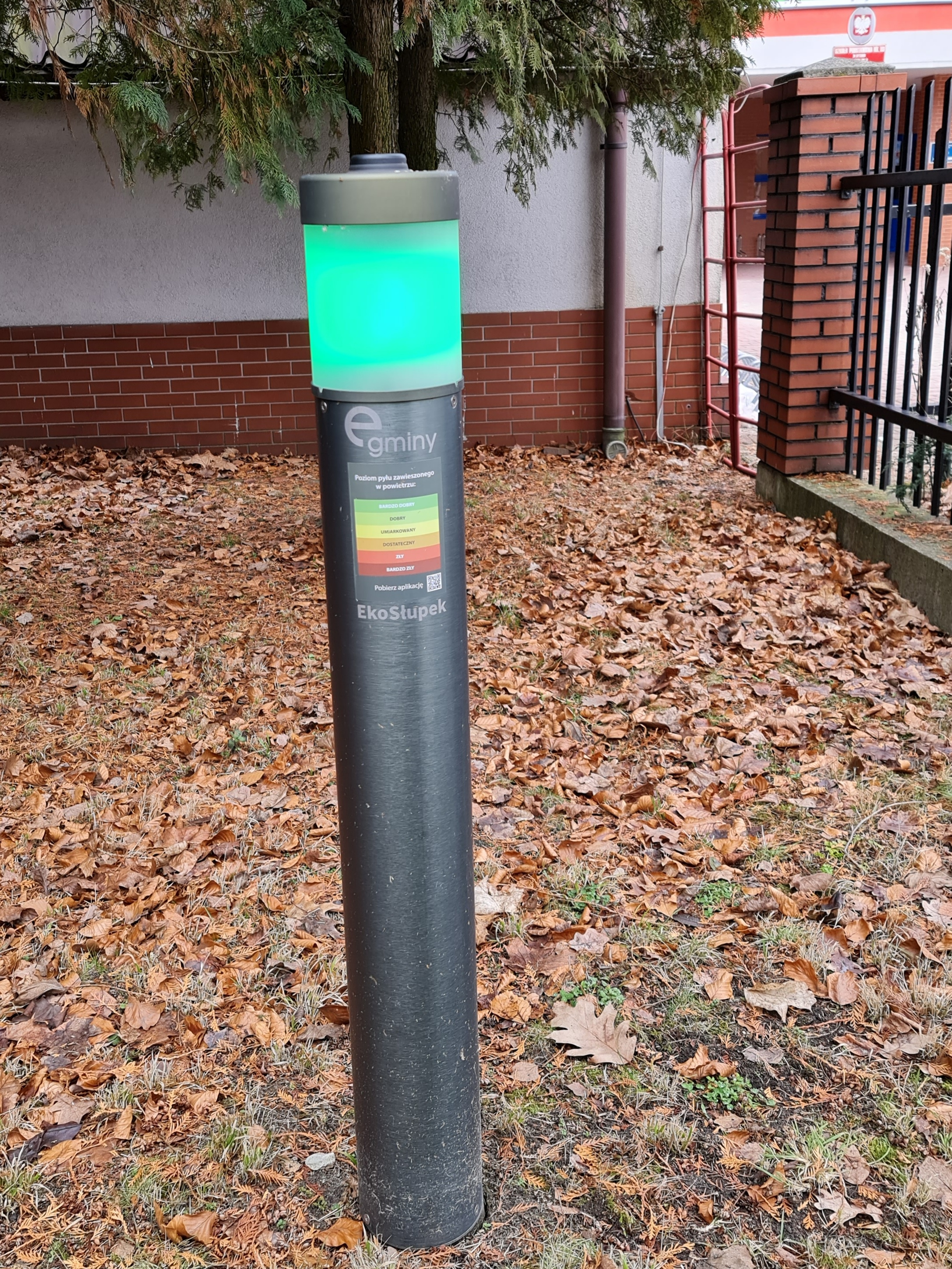
An EkoSłupek air pollution sensor in Poland. The green light indicates good nearby air quality.

Unlike low-cost monitors, which are carried from place to place, static monitors continuously sample and measure the air quality in a particular, urban location. Public places such as busy railroad stations sometimes have active air quality monitors permanently fixed alongside platforms to measure levels of nitrogen dioxide and other pollutants. Some static monitors are designed to give immediate feedback on local air quality. In Poland, EkoSłupek air monitors measure a range of pollutant gases and particulates and have small lamps on top that change colour from red to green to signal how healthy the air is nearby.

The increasing adoption of Internet of Things (IoT)-based air quality sensors has expanded the use of continuous, real-time monitoring in occupational and industrial environments. These systems can simultaneously measure particulate matter (PM_{1.0}, PM_{2.5}, and PM_{10}) together with gaseous pollutants such as carbon dioxide (CO_{2}), formaldehyde, and total volatile organic compounds (TVOCs), enabling the identification of pollution hotspots and supporting workplace exposure assessment and emission control strategies. A study conducted in industrial facilities in Tungurahua, Ecuador, demonstrated the effectiveness of IoT-based monitoring for detecting differences in pollutant concentrations across industrial sectors, highlighting its value as a tool for protecting workers' health and improving environmental management.

=== Large-scale pollution monitoring ===
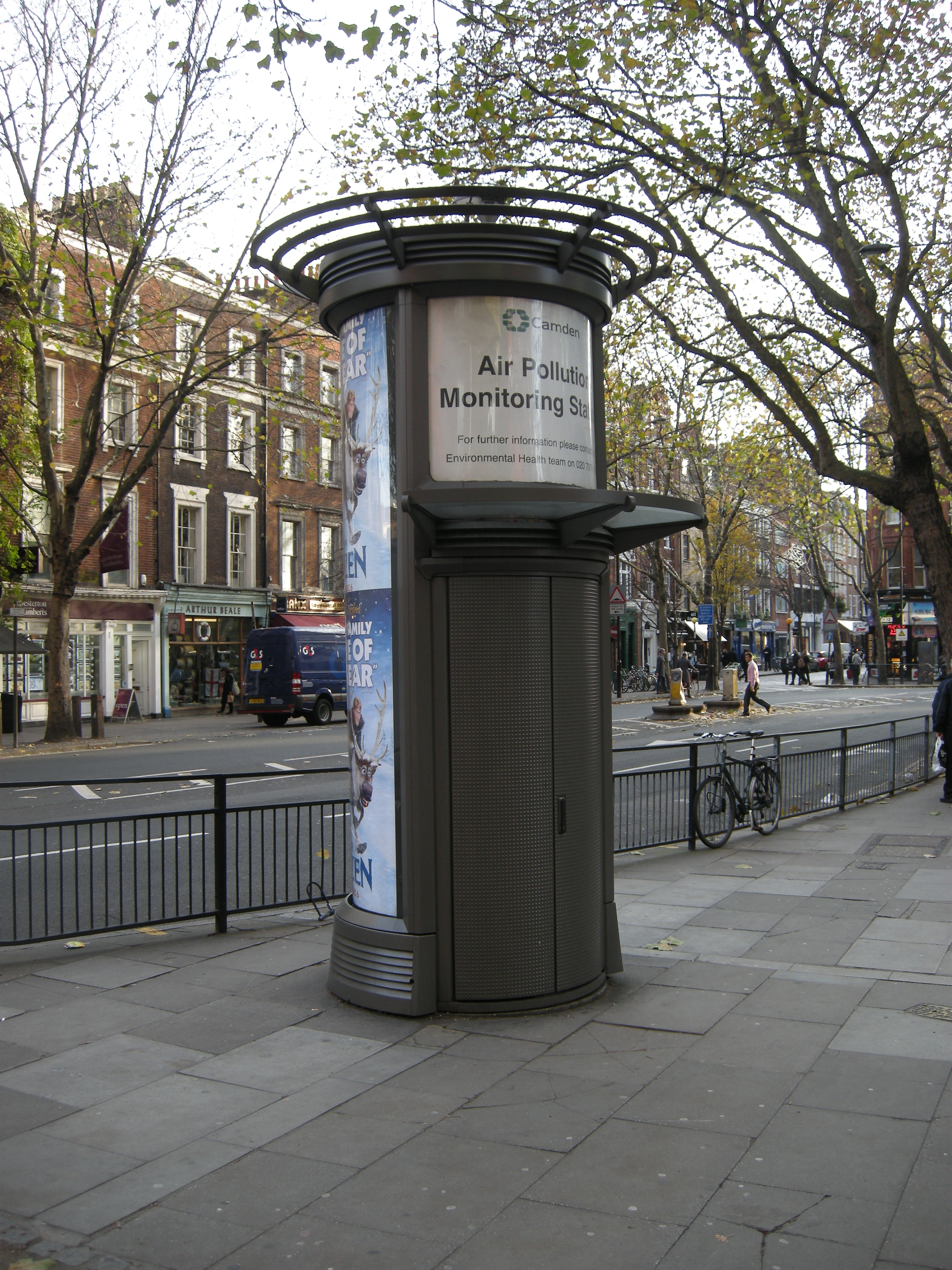
An air pollution monitoring station in Shaftesbury Avenue, London

At the opposite end of the spectrum from low-cost sensors are the large, very expensive, static street-side monitoring stations that constantly sample the various different pollutants commonly found in urban air for local authorities and that make up metropolitan monitoring systems such as the London Air Quality Network and a wider British network called the Automatic Urban and Rural Network (AURN). In the United States, the EPA maintains a repository of air quality data through the Air Quality System (AQS), where it stores data from over 10,000 monitors. The European Environment Agency collects its air quality data from 3,500 monitoring stations across the continent.

The measurements made by sensors like these, which are much more accurate, are also near real-time and are used to generate air quality indexes (AQIs). Between the two extremes of large-scale static and small-scale wearable sensors are medium-sized, portable monitors (sometimes mounted in large wheelable cases) and even built into "smog-mobile" sampling trucks.

Recently, drive-by air pollution sensing systems have emerged as a promising approach for air quality monitoring, utilizing sensors mounted on taxis, buses, trams, and other vehicles. In particular, buses have garnered considerable attention as a mobile sensing platform due to their widespread availability and extensive geographical coverage.

=== Remote monitoring ===
Air quality can also be measured remotely, from the air, by lidar, drones, and satellites, through methods such as gas filter correlation. Among the earliest satellite pollution monitoring efforts were GOME (Global Ozone Monitoring Experiment), which measured global (tropospheric) ozone levels from the ESA European Remote Sensing Satellite (ERS-2) in 1995, and NASA's MAPS (Mapping Pollution with Satellites), which measured the distribution of carbon monoxide in Earth's lower atmosphere, also in the 1990s.

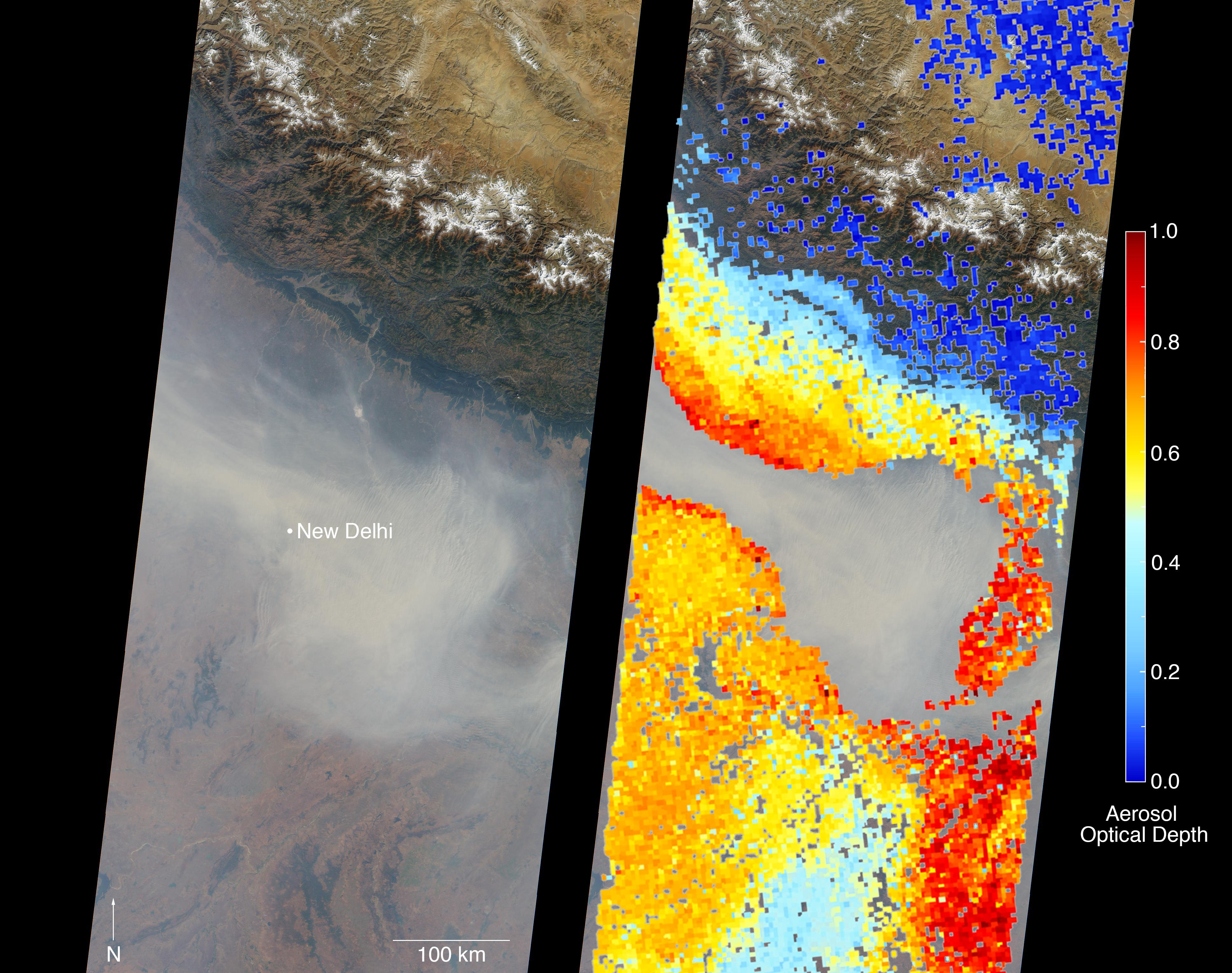
Measuring severe air pollution in New Delhi in 2016 using the Multi-angle Imaging SpectroRadiometer (MISR) instrument aboard NASA's Terra satellite

== Methods of measurement for different pollutants ==
Each different component of air pollution has to be measured by a different process, piece of equipment, or chemical reaction. Analytical chemistry techniques used for measuring pollution include gas chromatography; various forms of spectrometry, spectroscopy, and spectrophotometry; and flame photometry.

=== Particulates ===
Until the late 20th century, the amount of soot produced by something like a smokestack was often measured visually, and relatively crudely, by holding up cards with lines ruled onto them to indicate different shades of grey. These were known as Ringelmann charts, after their inventor, Max Ringelmann, and measured smoke on a six-point scale.

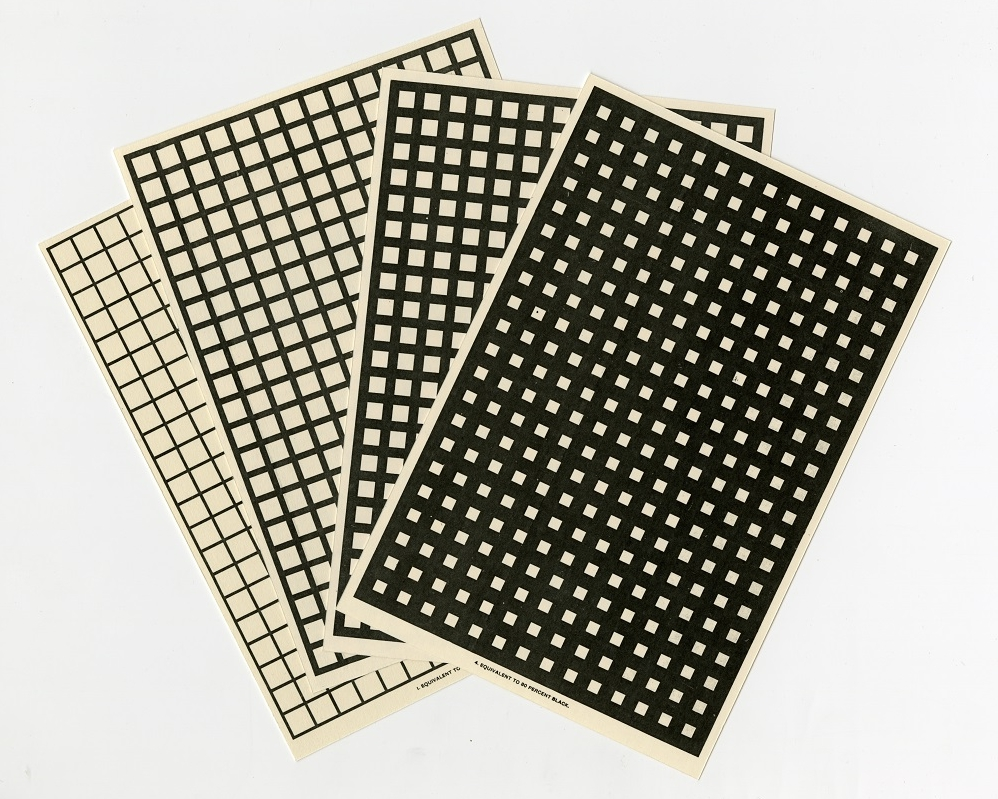
Ringelmann charts were developed for measuring smoke from chimneys and smokestacks at the end of the 19th century.

In modern pollution monitoring stations, coarse (PM_{10}) and fine (PM_{2.5}) particulates are measured using a device called a tapered element oscillating microbalance (TEOM), based on a glass tube that vibrates more or less as collected particles accumulate on it. Particulates can also be measured using other kinds of particulate matter sampler, including optical photodetectors, which measure the light reflected from samples of light (bigger particles reflect more light) and gravimetric analysis (collected on filters and weighed). Black carbon is usually measured optically with Aethalometer-type instruments.

Ultrafine particles (smaller than PM_{0.1}, so generally less than 100 nanometers in diameter) are hard to detect and measure with some of these techniques. Typically, they are measured (or counted) with condensation particle counters, which effectively enlarge the particles by condensing vapors onto them to make bigger and much more easily detectable droplets.

The atomic composition of particulate samples can be measured with techniques such as X-ray spectrometry.

=== Nitrogen dioxide ===
Nitrogen dioxide (NO_{2}) can be measured passively with diffusion tubes, though it takes time to collect samples, analyze them, and produce results. It can be measured manually or automatically through the Griess-Saltzman method, as specified in ISO 6768:1998, or the Jacobs-Hocheiser method.

It can also be measured automatically much more quickly, by a chemiluminescence analyzer, which determines nitrogen oxide levels from the light they give off. In the UK, for example, there are over 200 sites where NO_{2} is continuously monitored by chemiluminescence.

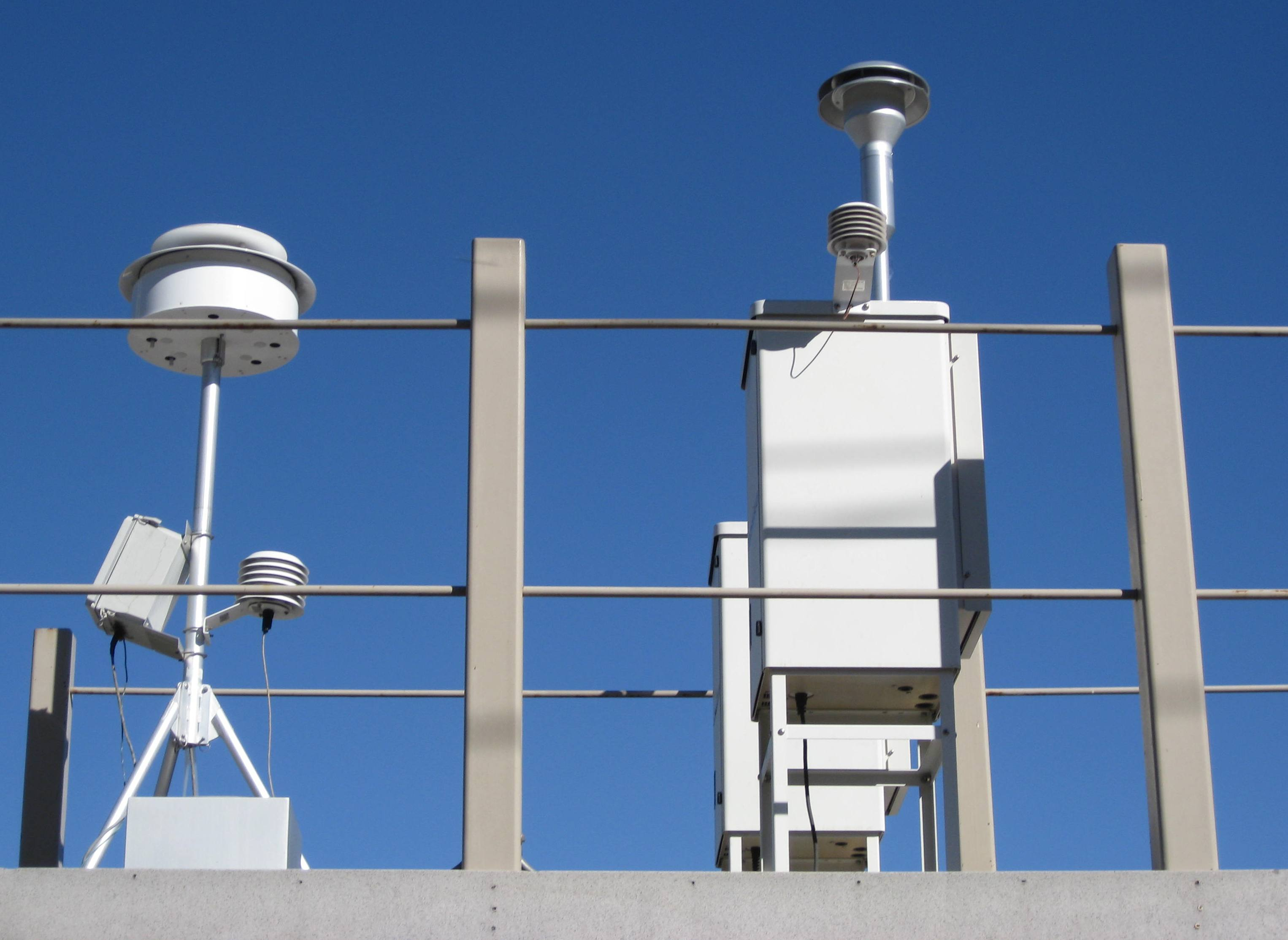
Air monitoring stations sample and measure multiple pollutants. This station in Reno, Nevada, monitors carbon monoxide, ozone, fine and coarse particulates (PM_{2.5} and PM_{10}), and nitrogen dioxide.

=== Sulfur dioxide and hydrogen sulfide ===
Sulfur dioxide (SO_{2}) is measured by fluorescence spectroscopy. This involves firing ultraviolet light at a sample of the air and measuring the fluorescence produced. Absorption spectrophotometers are also used for measuring SO_{2}. Flame photometric analyzers are used for measuring other sulphur compounds in the air. Older methods of measuring sulfur dioxide involved passing air samples through glass bottles containing iodine, hydrogen peroxide, or sodium or potassium tetrachloromercurate.

=== Carbon monoxide and carbon dioxide ===
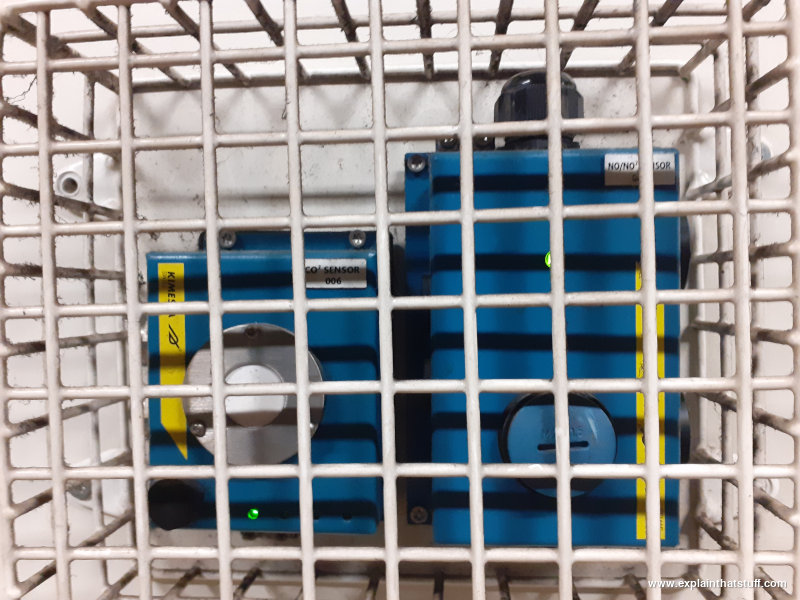
Carbon dioxide and nitrogen dioxide sensors at Birmingham New Street train station

Carbon monoxide (CO) and carbon dioxide (CO_{2}) are measured by non-dispersive infrared (NDIR) light absorption based on the Beer-Lambert law. CO can also be measured using electrochemical gel sensors and metal-oxide semiconductor (MOS) detectors, which are used in household carbon monoxide detectors.

=== Ozone ===
Ozone (O_{3}) is measured by seeing how much light a sample of ambient air absorbs. Higher concentrations of ozone absorb more light according to the Beer-Lambert law.

=== Volatile organic compounds (VOCs) ===
These are measured using gas chromatography and flame ionization (GC-FID).

=== Hydrocarbons ===
Hydrocarbons can be measured by gas chromatography and flame ionization detectors. They are sometimes expressed as separate measurements of methane (CH_{4}), NMHC (non-methane hydrocarbons), and THC (total hydrocarbon) emissions (where THC is the sum of CH_{4} and NMHC emissions).

=== Ammonia ===
Ammonia (NH_{3}) can be measured by various methods including chemiluminescence.

== Natural measurements ==
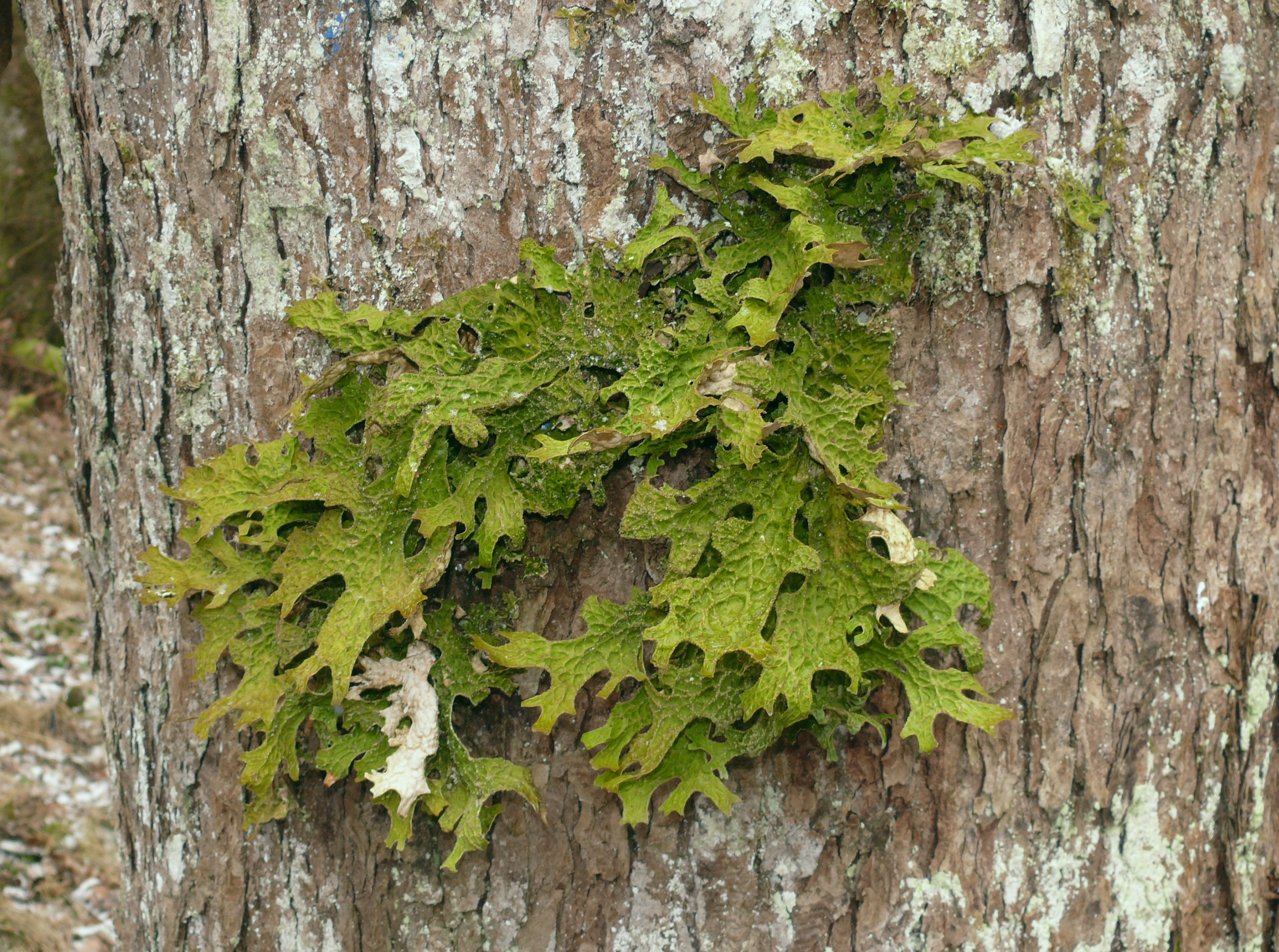
Lichens such as Lobaria pulmonaria are sensitive to air pollution.

Air pollution can also be assessed more qualitatively by observing the effect of polluted air on growing plants such as lichens and mosses (an example of biomonitoring). Some scientific projects have used specially grown plants such as strawberries.

== Measurement units ==
The amount of pollutant present in air is usually expressed as a concentration, measured in either parts-per notation (usually parts per billion, ppb, or parts per million, ppm, also known as the volume mixing ratio), or micrograms per cubic meter (μg/m^{3}). It's relatively simple to convert one of these units into the other, taking account the different molecular weights of different gases and their temperatures and pressures.

These units express the concentration of air pollution in terms of the mass or volume of the pollutant, and they are commonly used for measurements of both gaseous pollutants, such as nitrogen dioxide, and coarse (PM_{10}) and fine (PM_{2.5}) particulates. An alternative measurement for particulates, particle number, expresses the concentration in terms of the number of particles per volume of air instead, which can be a more meaningful way of assessing the health harms of highly toxic ultrafine particles (PM_{0.1}, less than 0.1 μm in diameter). Particle number can be measured with equipment such as condensation particle counters.

Urban air quality index (AQI) values are computed by combining or comparing the concentrations of a "basket" of common air pollutants (typically ozone, carbon monoxide, sulfur dioxide, nitrogen oxides, and both fine and coarse particulates) to produce a single number on an easy-to-understand (and often colour-coded) scale.

== History ==
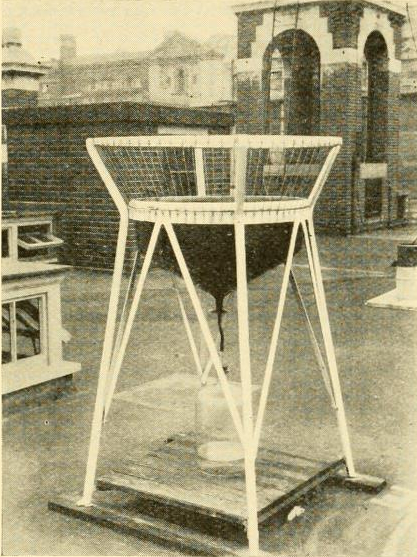
An early deposit gauge used for measuring air pollution. Photograph from The Smoke Problem of Great Cities by Shaw and Owens, 1925.

Air pollution was first systematically measured, in Britain, in the 19th century. In 1852, Scottish chemist Robert Angus Smith discovered (and named) acid rain after collecting rain samples that turned out to contain significant quantities of sulfur from coal burning. According to a chronology of air pollution by David Fowler and colleagues, Smith was "the first scientist to attempt multisite, multipollutant investigations of the chemical climatology of the polluted atmosphere".

In the early 20th century, Irish physician and environmental engineer John Switzer Owens and the Committee for the Investigation of Atmospheric Pollution, of which he was secretary, greatly advanced the measurement and monitoring of air pollution using a network of deposit gauges. Owens also developed a number of new methods of measuring pollution.

In December 1952, the Great Smog of London led to the deaths of 12,000 people. This event, and similar ones such as the 1948 Donora smog tragedy in the United States, became one of the great turning points in environmental history because they brought about a radical rethink in pollution control. In the UK, the Great Smog of London lead directly to the Clean Air Act, which may have had consequences even more far reaching than it originally intended. Catastrophic events like this led to pollution being measured and controlled much more rigorously.

== See also ==
- Air quality index
- Environmental monitoring
