= INDELA-I.N.SKY =

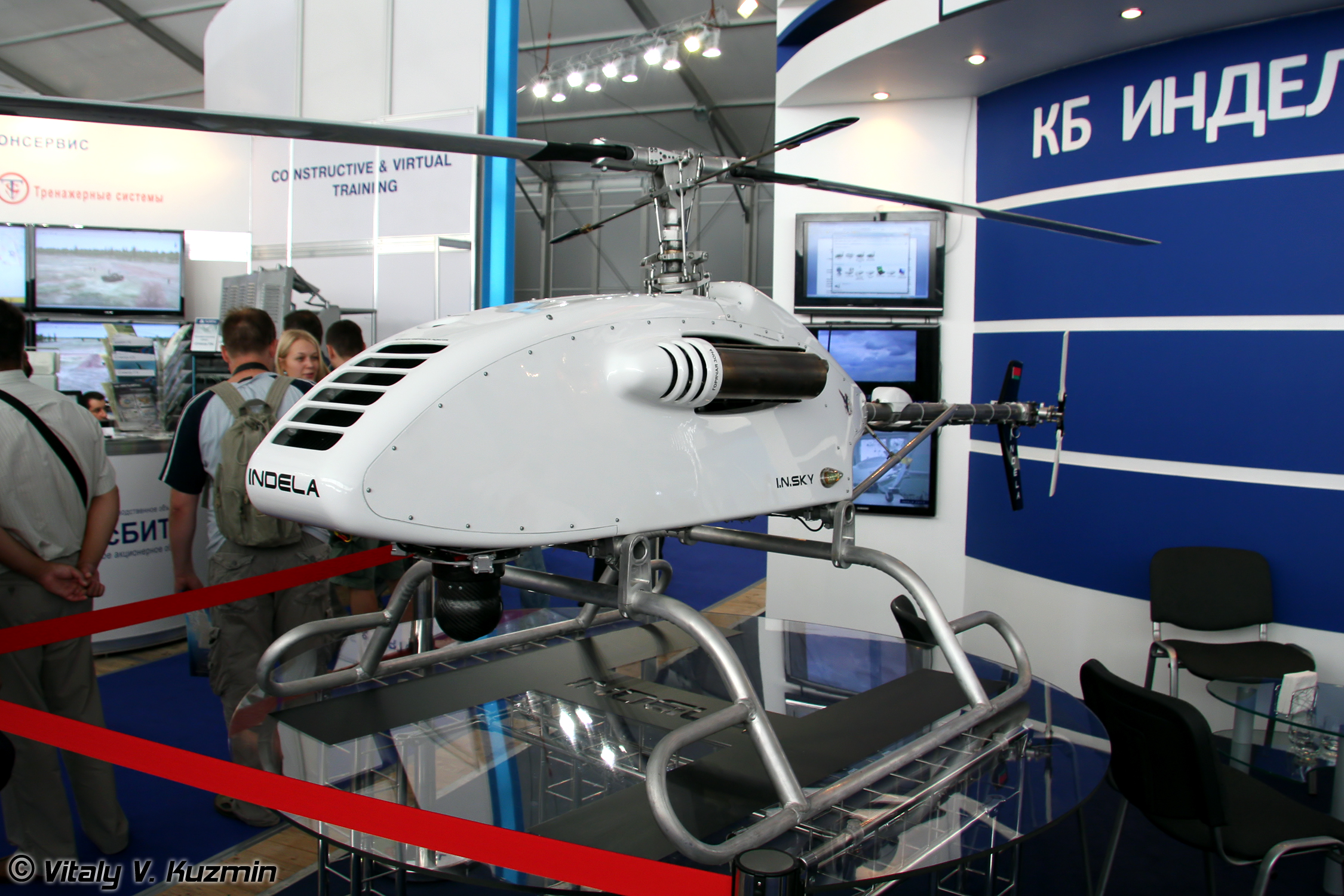
- INDELA-I.N.SKY at MAKS-2011

General information
- Type: Reconnaissance UAV
- National origin: Belarus
- Manufacturer: KB INDELA Ltd

INDELA-I.N.SKY is a Belarusian rotary wing unmanned aerial vehicle, medium-range with the weight up to 140 kg. It is developed and produced by KB INDELA Ltd. Serial production has been set up since 2014.

INDELA-I.N.SKY is designed for monitoring of remote and extensive objects at long distances, intelligence and surveillance, search and detection of objects with the determination of exact geographic coordinates, recognition and auto tracking of moving objects, cargo delivery and payload release.

UAV INDELA-I.N.SKY is a part of multifunctional unmanned aircraft system INDELA-SKY. The helicopter is controlled via ground control station INDELA-GCS.

== Performance characteristics ==
Technical characteristics:

Length/height	3052/1346 mm (120.2/53 in.)
Main rotor diameter	3400 mm (133.9 in.)
Wheelbase	1180 mm (46.5 in.)
Takeoff weight	140 kg (308.6 lb)
Payload weight	25 kg (55 lb)
Standard fuel margin	29 kg (63.9 lb)
Takeoff capacity	26 kW (34.9 hp)
Fuel consumption	5–8 kg/h (11 - 17.6 lb/h)
Engine	four cycle, rotary piston
Cooling system	liquid

Flight characteristics:

Flight duration	5 h
Practical flight range	350 km (217.5 mi)
Cruise speed near the ground	75 km/h (46.6 mph)
Static ceiling	1500 m (4921.3 ft)
Max. allowable wind speed during takeoff	37 km/h (23 mph)
Operating temperature	−40...+55 °C (−40...+131 °F)

== Technical possibilities ==
UAV INDELA-I.N.SKY fulfills vertical automatic takeoff and landing, automatic flight and return to the start point in case of communication loss.

Unmanned helicopter operates without a prepared runway, system deployment time is up to 15 min.

UAV flight has 4 modes:

- Autonomous. UAV follows a specified route. At any moment during flight mission coordinates can be changed, added or deleted.
- Mode "To the point". UAV follows in automatic mode to the specified point. After the flight to the point the RPA mode is turned on.
- Remotely piloted (RPA). This mode is used to study the territory/terrain; it is more flexible in comparison with waypoint navigation.
- Mode "Home". UAV automatic piloting mode to the takeoff point regardless of the previous mode.

Flight mission can have a route of various configuration and consist of more than 2000 intermediate points. It can be rapidly edited during the execution, including the change of the height and flight speed form point to point. INDELA-I.N.SKY is equipped with gyro-stabilized electro-optical system INDELA OGD-20HIR for monitoring, surveillance and intelligence. This system includes thermal imager, color camera, laser rangefinder, video processor and inertial module. INDELA OGD-20HIR allows conducting of aerial photography, determining of range to target and receiving on monitors of the ground control station color, black and white and in infrared range video images in real time.

Electro-optical system allows detecting of moving target and its automatic tracking. Target "auto tracking" is performed at day and night hours. Construction of the UAV INDELA-I.N.SKY allows increasing of aircraft navigation equipment and installing different types of payloads (radiometer, air pollution sensor, direction finding systems, detachable containers with cargo, rescue equipment, special-purpose equipment, etc.).

UAV INDELA-I.N.SKY can deliver cargo at exactly specified coordinates. Dosed release of the payload is possible.

== Unmanned aircraft system INDELA-SKY ==
UAV INDELA-I.N.SKY is a part of multifunctional unmanned aircraft system INDELA-SKY. The system includes two unmanned helicopters INDELA-I.N.SKY and ground control station INDELA-GCS, located in transport shelter or minibus. System architecture allows for UAVs of different classes to be incorporated into one system INDELA-SKY, including UAVs of other manufacturers.

Several GCS can be united in a single information network, what allows for automatic data exchange and coordination of operators' activity.

Ground control station is equipped with life-support system, consisting of air conditioner, heating unit, uninterruptible power supply, petrol generator, and ventilation unit with the possibility to purify intake air from coarse dust, chemical and radioactive substances. Operating time in autonomous mode is 24 hours, in noiseless mode from accumulators – 5 hours.

GCS is a mobile; it is adapted for mounting on any cross-road chassis and designed for transportation in any vehicles.
