= London Air Quality Network =

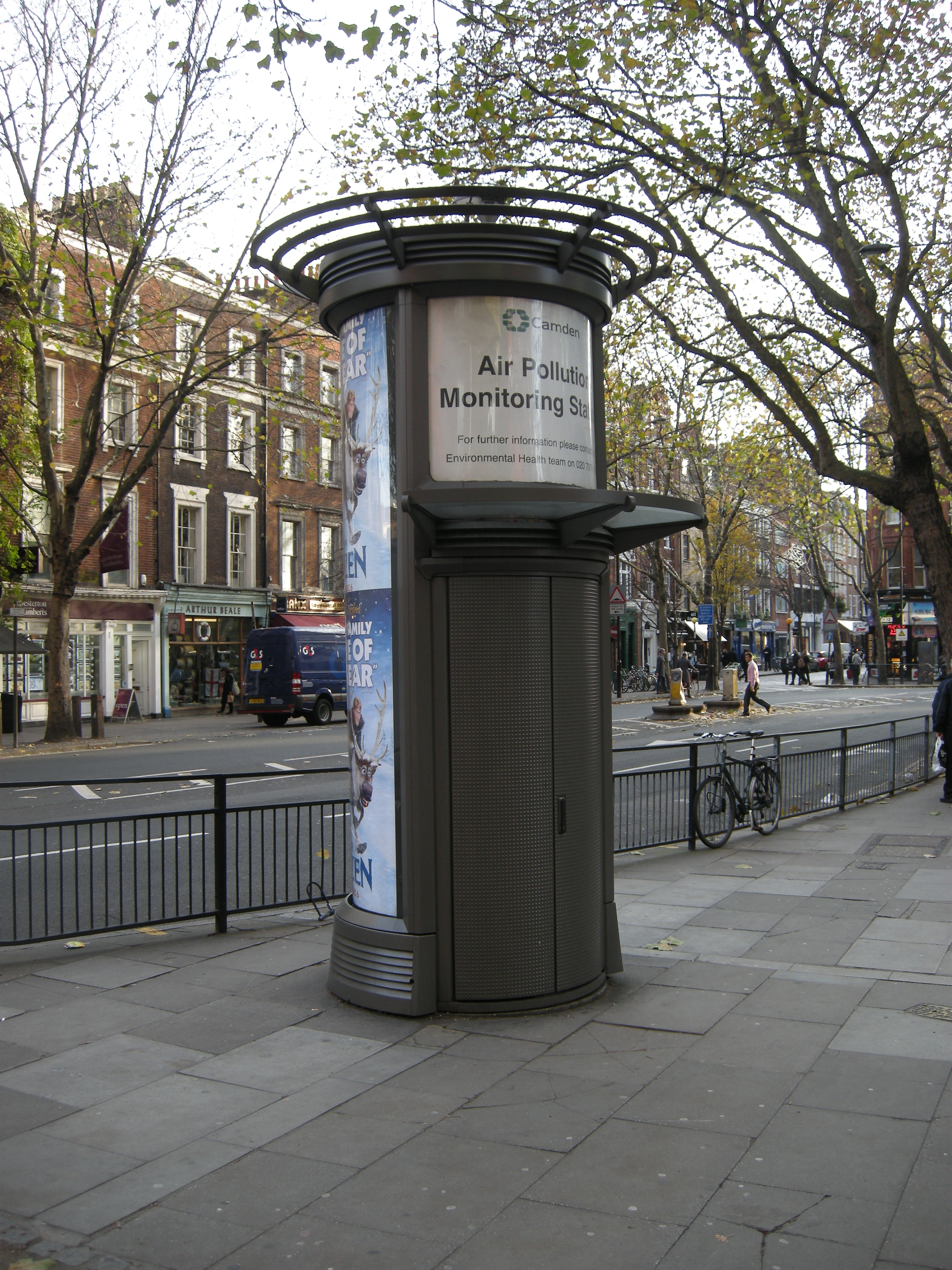
An air pollution monitoring station in Shaftesbury Avenue, London – part of the London Air Quality Network

The London Air Quality Network (LAQN) is a collection of urban air pollution monitoring stations in London and South East England. Launched in 1993 by researchers at King's College, London, it is currently managed by the Environmental Research Group of Imperial College with funding from local authorities, business improvement districts, Transport for London, and Defra, and has grown to become "the largest air-quality measuring system of its kind in the world".

Each monitoring station consists of automated sensing equipment in a fixed cabin, typically positioned by a roadside or other busy urban area, which takes various pollution samples roughly every 15 minutes, so allowing both short- and long-term analysis of air quality.

The data produced by the network has been used to inform scientific and medical research, public policy, and public understanding of air pollution issues for over three decades. It's also used to generate near-real-time air-quality measurements, pollution maps, statistics, and alerts through a dedicated website (londonair.org.uk), phone app ("London Air"), and Twitter feed (@londonair), as well as bus and tube station "countdown" signs.
