= P. A. Sheppard =

Professor Percival Sheppard
- Born: Percival Albert Sheppard; 12 May 1907; Box, Wiltshire
- Died: 22 December 1977 (aged 70)
- Awards: Fellow of the Royal Society; Order of the British Empire
- Scientific career
- Institutions: Imperial College, London

Professor Percival Albert "Peter" Sheppard CBE FRS (12 May 1907 – 22 December 1977) was a meteorologist at Imperial College, London from 1952 to 1974 and thereafter emeritus professor.

He was born in Box, Wiltshire and was educated at City of Bath Boys School and the University of Bristol, graduating with a first class honours BSc in 1927. He stayed on there as a student demonstrator, doing research on the loading of gaseous ions by polar molecules.

In 1929, he joined the Meteorological Office at Kew Observatory, where he carried out studies on the atmospheric electrical balance in good and bad weather. In 1932 he was one of a six-man British expedition to Fort Rae in Northwest Canada, where he carried out observations of atmospheric electricity. The following year he was posted to the Chemical Warfare Experimental Station at Porton Down in Wiltshire, where he spent five years studying air motion in the boundary layer (the first few 100 metres above the Earth's surface).

In 1939 he was appointed a reader in Meteorology at Imperial College but when war broke out was seconded to the Air Ministry to set up a Meteorological Office Training School in London to train weather forecasters. After the war, he returned to Imperial College, where he helped Professor David Brunt establish a teaching programme for the Diploma of Imperial College and the University of London Master of Science degree, eventually succeeding him as professor in 1952. He continued his work on atmospheric motion in the boundary layer, but gradually became more involved in committee work and lecturing.

In 1939 he was elected a Fellow of the Royal Meteorological Society and served as a council member, editor of the Quarterly Journal, vice-president and president (1957–59). In 1963 he was honoured for his lifetime's work with the society's Symons Gold Medal and with the award of a CBE. He was elected a Fellow of the Royal Society in 1964.

He died in 1977. He had married Phyllis and had two sons.
