= Reginald Sutcliffe =

British meteorologist

- Born: Wrexham
- Occupation: Meteorologist
- Employer: University of Reading
- Awards: International Meteorological Organization Prize (1963); Chree Medal and Prize (1959); Symons Gold Medal (1955)

Reginald Cockcroft Sutcliffe FRS (16 November 1904 – 28 May 1991) was a British meteorologist.

Born in Wrexham but raised in Yorkshire, where his father was a shop manager, he won a scholarship to the University of Leeds, where he gained first class honours in mathematics. After studying for a PhD with William Berwick he joined the Meteorological Office in 1927.

Sutcliffe first made a major impact with the publication in 1939 of his book Meteorology for Aviators, which became essential reading for RAF pilots during the Second World War. During the beginning of the war he was posted to France with the BEF to make forecasts for flying operations over Europe, and with the final collapse was one of the last British servicemen to escape from France. Later in the war he worked for Bomber Command, playing an important role in forecasting for air raids over Germany.

During and after the war, Sutcliffe also worked on the theory of meteorology, and his most important contribution was to use pressure instead of height as vertical co-ordinate in the atmosphere.

Sutcliffe retired from the Met Office in 1965, but did not end his career. Noting the lack of university-level education in meteorology in the UK, he founded a new meteorological department at the University of Reading, offering Britain's first undergraduate course with meteorology as its principal subject. He retired from academic life in 1970, and died at Cadmore End in 1991.

== Works ==
- Meteorology for aviators, London : H.M.S.O, 1939
- Weather and climate, London : Weidenfeld, Nicolson, 1966

== Honours and awards ==
In 1955 he was awarded the Symons Gold Medal of the Royal Meteorological Society. He held many posts outside the Met Office, including serving as president of the Royal Meteorological Society from 1955 to 1957, and the International Association for Meteorology and Atmospheric Physics from 1967 to 1971.

He was elected a Fellow of the Royal Society in 1957; a development which was widely seen as confirmation that meteorology had been accepted as a true science.

He won the Chree medal and prize in 1959.

In 1963 he was awarded the International Meteorological Organization Prize of the World Meteorological Organization.
