= Deposit gauge =

Scientific instrument

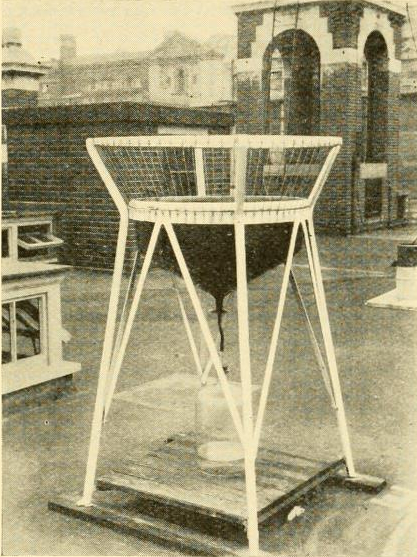
An early deposit gauge for collecting particulates such as soot in air pollution, photographed c.1910, as illustrated in the book The Smoke Problem of Great Cities by Shaw and Owens, 1925.

A deposit gauge is a large, funnel-like scientific instrument used for capturing and measuring atmospheric particulates, notably soot, carried in air pollution and deposited back down to ground.

== Design and construction ==
Deposit gauges are similar to rain gauges. They have a large circular funnel on top, made of a material that will not be corroded by acid rain (such as stone, in early versions, or anodized aluminium, in modern ones). This is mounted on a simple wooden or metal stand, which drains down into a collection bottle beneath. Typically the funnel has a wire-mesh screen around its perimeter to deter perching birds. They are made to a standardized design, which means the pollution collected in different places can be systematically studied and compared. The bottle is removed after a period of time (usually from a week to a month) and the contents taken away for analysis of water (such as rain, fog, and snow), insoluble matter (such as soot), and soluble matter.

=== Standard designs ===
The various standardized designs include:

- The standard deposit gauge, introduced in 1916 and formalized in a British Standard in 1951
- The International Standard (ISO/DIS 4222.2) deposit gauge
- The Norwegian NILU gauge, which is similar to the ISO gauge
- The German Standard VDI 2119
- ASTM D1739

== Early history ==
The first gauges of this type were developed in the early 20th century by W.J. Russell of St Bartholomew's Hospital and the Coal Smoke Abatement Society. Between 1910 and 1916, the design was refined and standardized by the Committee for the Investigation of Atmospheric Pollution, a group of expert, volunteer scientists studying air pollution of which Sir Napier Shaw, first director of the Met Office, was chair. The first scientific paper featuring deposit gauge measurements was titled "The Sootfall of London: Its Amount, Quality, and Effects" and published in The Lancet in January 1912. Thanks to the introduction of the deposit gauge, air quality in Britain was monitored systematically from 1914 onward and this played an important role in determining the effectiveness of efforts to control pollution. By 1927, some deposit gauges were already showing 50 percent reductions in "deposited matter", although air pollution remained a major problem.

Over the next few decades, deposit gauges were deployed in many British towns and cities, allowing rough comparisons to be made of pollution in different parts of the country. According to pollution historian Stephen Mosley, by 1949, some 177 gauges had been deployed across Britain, so creating the world's first large-scale pollution monitoring network, but the number increased dramatically after the Great London Smog of 1952, reaching 615 in 1954 and 1066 in 1966.

== Modern use ==
Although deposit gauges were inaccurate and their limitations were well known from the start, their widespread introduction still represented a considerable advance in the study and comparison of pollution at different times of the year and in different places. In his book State, Science and the Skies: Governmentalities of the British Atmosphere, Mark Whitehead, a geography lecturer at Aberystywth University, has described the deposit gauge as "perhaps the most important technological device in the history of Britain's air pollution monitoring". Even so, from the mid-20th century, it was gradually superseded by more accurate instruments and better methods of data collection and analysis.

Today, although air pollution is more likely to be measured with automated electronic sensors, deposit gauges are still used. Modern variants of the standard deposit gauge include the so-called "frisbee" gauge, in which the deposit collector is shaped like an inverted frisbee; the Bergerhoff gauge, in which a single glass vessel mounted on a stand acts as both the collector and deposit bottle; and the directional dust deposit gauge (DDDG), which has four tall, removable bottles to collect and compare deposits arriving from different directions.

== See also ==
- Rain gauge
- Air pollution measurement
