= Charles Normand =

Scottish meteorologist

Sir Charles William Blyth Normand CIE (10 September 1889 – 25 October 1982) was a Scottish meteorologist.

== Career ==
Born in Edinburgh, Normand was educated at the Royal High School and studied mathematics, physics and chemistry at Edinburgh University. In 1913, he was appointed Imperial Meteorologist in India. During the First World War, he served as a meteorological officer with the Indian Army in Mesopotamia. On his return to India he conducted research into atmospheric humidity, and became Director-General of Observatories in India in 1927. He was a member of the Indian Science Congress and a founder of the Indian Academy of Sciences. He was knighted in 1945.

In 1946, Normand moved to Oxford, where he studied atmospheric ozone. He served as Secretary of the International Ozone Commission from 1948 to 1959 and President of the Royal Meteorological Society between 1951 and 1953, receiving their Symons Gold Medal in 1944.
