= John S. A. Green =

British meteorologist

John Green
- Born: John Sydney Adcock Green; 1931; Gainsborough, Lincolnshire
- Died: 17 March 2012 (aged 80–81)
- Education: Imperial College London
- Occupation: Meteorologist
- Employer(s): Imperial College London; University of East Anglia
- Known for: Methods for forecasting of large weather systems
- Spouses: Evelyn Grove; Jill Austin
- Awards: Buchan Prize (RMetS) 1975; Symons Gold Medal (RMetS) 2005

John Sidney Adcock Green (1931–2012) was a British meteorologist.

He was born in Gainsborough, Lincolnshire to a cabinet-maker and his wife. In 1950 he obtained employment at the National Almanac office in the Royal Greenwich Observatory, Herstmonceux, Sussex and then studied mathematics at Imperial College London graduating B.Sc. in 1955. He was awarded a PhD in 1961 for his research into baroclinic instability.

After receiving his Ph.D, he was appointed as Lecturer in the Department of Meteorology at Imperial College and subsequently rose to the position of Reader. In 1986 he moved to the School of Environmental Sciences at the University of East Anglia at Norwich. He taught there until retiring as Reader in 1996.

In 1970 he published his theory of global atmospheric circulation based on a deep understanding of weather systems. His results agreed qualitatively with observations of trade wind patterns that had intrigued scientists since the 17th century.

He was awarded the Buchan Prize of the Royal Meteorological Society in 1975. He was Vice-President of the Society in 1981 and their Symons Gold Medal recipient in 2004.

== Personal life ==
He married and divorced twice, first Evelyn Grove and then Dr. Jill Austin, whom he met at Imperial College. He and Dr. Austin had three children. He died in the hospital at Norwich on 17 March 2012.
