= John Switzer Owens =

Irish physician and environmental engineer

- Born: 28 July 1871; Enniscorthy
- Died: 6 December 1941 (aged 70)
- Education: Trinity College Dublin
- Known for: Air pollution; Environmental engineering
- Awards: Symons Gold Medal; 1942
- Scientific career
- Fields: Engineering; Medicine

John Switzer Owens (28 July 1871 – 6 December 1941) was an Irish physician and environmental engineer. He invented some of the first scientific instruments for collecting and measuring air pollution and helped to establish the first large-scale pollution monitoring network in the United Kingdom.

== Early life ==
Owens was born in Enniscorthy, County Wexford, and trained to be a doctor at Trinity College Dublin, where he took B.A., M.D., and B.Ch. degrees. In his late twenties, he gave up medicine and developed an interest in environmental engineering, which he studied at Durham College of Science. Later, he became an authority on coastal erosion and sea defences, and developed new forms of durable beach groynes based on reinforced concrete. He also worked as a mining engineer in Britain, Spain, and Portugal.

== Work on air pollution ==
Owens' interest in air pollution developed as a member of the Coal Smoke Abatement Society (later known as the National Society for Clean Air, now Environmental Protection UK). This led to his appointment, in 1917, as the first secretary of the Committee for the Investigation of Atmospheric Pollution, a voluntary group of scientists, using facilities provided by The Lancet, that eventually became an advisory committee to the Met Office. Sir Napier Shaw, who was chairman of the same committee and first director of the Met Office, described Owens as the "moving spirit" behind the initiative, noting that as both an engineer and a doctor, he "possessed an extraordinary qualification for dealing with the subject of atmospheric pollution".

In 1925, Shaw and Owens co-authored the book The Smoke Problem of Great Cities. Almost three decades before the Great London Smog claimed thousands of lives, they warned of air pollution's growing menace: "The concentrated impurity in the air of some of our modern cities is so great that it has become a menace to public health as well as a serious source of financial loss to the community". The book's striking frontispiece was a photograph of a man weighed down with a huge sack on his back titled "The soot fall in a minute within the county of London and a Londoner on the same scale".

In a paper Owens read to the Royal Society of Arts the same year, he was even more emphatic: "The evil of atmospheric pollution has crept on us almost unawares, with the increase in the use of raw coal. The gradual growth of population and collection of people into monstrous cities have gone on until now the number of fires concentrated in small areas is so great that the air over our cities is like the inside of a huge chimney."

In 1927, Owens became Superintendent of Observations at the Department of Scientific and Industrial Research and occupied that role until his death.

=== Measuring instruments ===
Owens is notable for the advances he made in quantifying and comparing air pollution: he personally invented several new measuring instruments, and the Committee for the Investigation of Atmospheric Pollution, which he steered, developed the standard deposit gauge. This funnel-like device captured soot falling from the sky in collection bottles, allowing it to be weighed and compared with deposits taken elsewhere. Deposit gauges were deployed in 27 locations by 1917, rising to 1066 locations in 1966, so creating the first large-scale pollution monitoring network in the UK. According to air pollution historian Stephen Mosley, Owens keenly understood the need for systematic measurements of pollution: "On the importance of monitoring, John S. Owens insisted that sound data gathered on smoke was 'often the first step' toward pollution control, as it exerted a 'profound psychological effect upon a city when it has been shown that the air which its inhabitants have to breathe and live in is abnormally dirty."

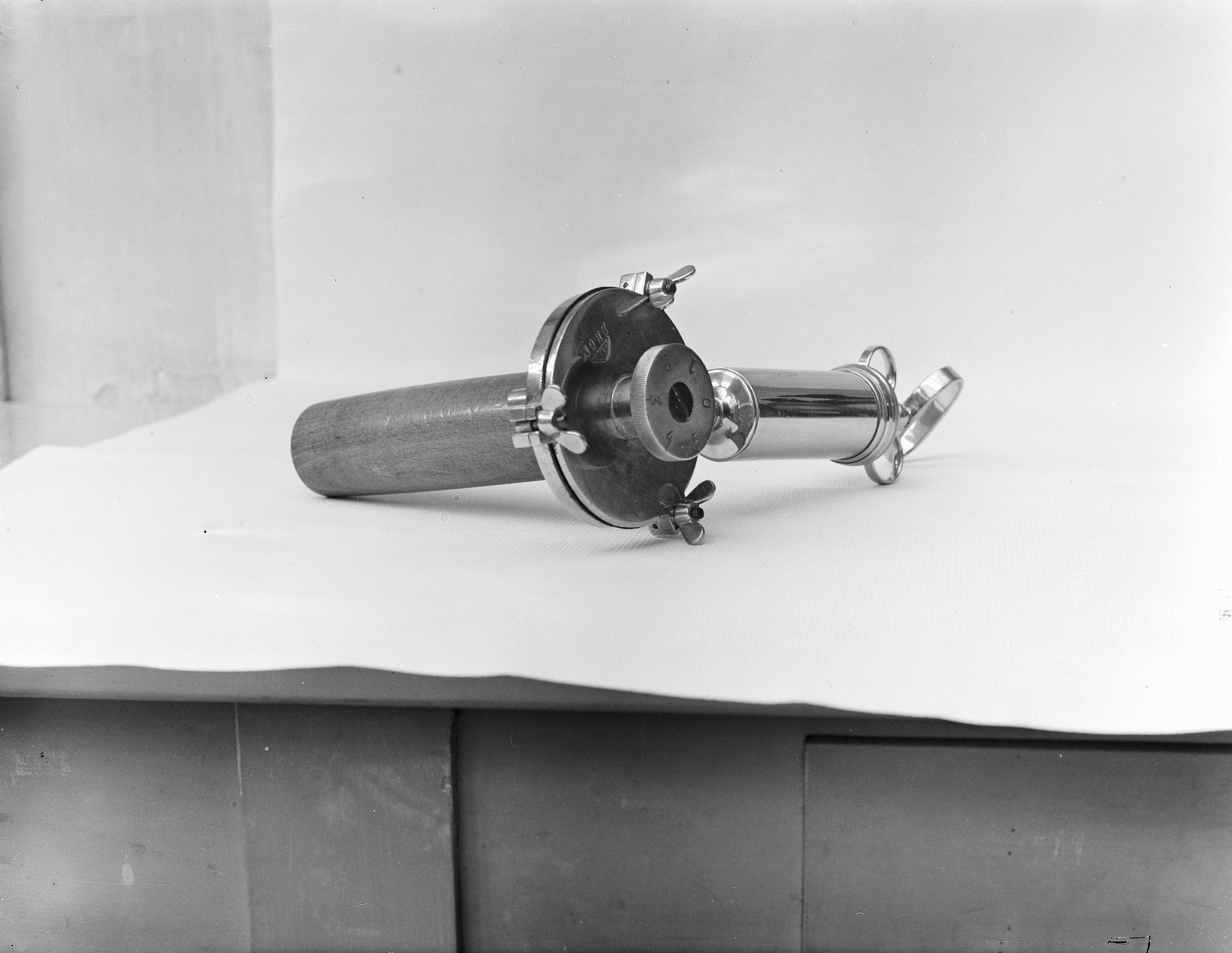
The jet dust counter – one of numerous air pollution measuring instruments that Owens invented.

Owens later developed other, more sophisticated (and more automated) pollution measuring devices, including one based on a siphon and, in 1921, another, known as the jet dust counter, that accelerated air samples toward glass slides so the composition of pollution could be studied under a microscope. Two of Owens' inventions were patented in Britain as "An Instrument for Measuring the Density of Smoke from Factory and other Chimneys" (1911) and "Apparatus for Measuring the Amount of Suspended Impurity in the Air" (1914); Owens held around 30 other British patents for devices as varied as concrete mixers, bomb throwers, sheet pilers, and various forms of sea defence.

Owens' jet dust counter was one of the first instruments to demonstrate that air pollution could travel over long distances. In his description of the invention, he speculated that the particles he observed in England might have been "derived from the smoke of Continental fires... it appears highly probable that the great industrial effort now being made by Germany is, under certain conditions, responsible for a fair proportion of the suspended impurity in the air over this country". Unlike the deposit gauge, Owens' jet dust counter was largely neglected – and, with it, the idea of long-distance pollution as an international problem. According to pollution scientist Gary Fuller, Owens was years ahead of his time: "If Owens' device had been perfected, we might have taken early steps to control UK coal burning to prevent Scandinavia's acid rain crisis of the 1970s and 1980s, and action to avoid the air pollution that still covers western Europe each spring and summer."

== Death and legacy ==
On Owens' death in 1941, an obituary in the science journal Nature described him as "a most useful and public-spirited man of science. For nearly thirty years Dr. Owens has been the moving spirit in the investigation of atmospheric pollution on its quantitative side. He devised the instruments in use, and co-ordinated, tabulated and prepared for publication all the data on which the progressive changes in the amount of pollution in the atmosphere are evaluated."

The Royal Meteorological Society awarded Owens its Symons Gold Medal in 1942 in recognition of his air pollution work. The same year, Sir George Clark of the Royal Geographical Society also paid tribute to Owens and "his pioneer work in the study of atmospheric pollution and smoke-abatement".

In his 2018 book The Invisible Killer, scientist Gary Fuller argued that Owens was a crucial figure "who more than any other person would define the transformation of air pollution science from the haphazard investigations of Victorian gentlemen into a systematic national surveillance program..."

== Selected publications ==
- Owens, John Switzer; Case, Gerald O. (1909). Coast Erosion and Foreshore Protection. London: St. Bride's Press.
- Owens, John Switzer (1922). "Suspended Impurity in the Air". Proc. R. Soc. Lond. A. 101 (708): 18–37. Bibcode:1922RSPSA.101...18O. doi:10.1098/rspa.1922.0023.
- Shaw, Napier; Owens, John Switzer (1925). The Smoke Problem of Great Cities. London: Constable & Company.
- Owens, John Switzer (27 March 1925). "Modern Atmospheric Conditions: With Special Reference to London". Journal of the Royal Society of Arts. 73 (3775): 434–457. JSTOR 41357699.
- Owens, John Switzer (1926). "Condensation of Water from the Air upon Hygroscopic Crystals". Proc. R. Soc. Lond. A. 110 (756): 738–752. Bibcode:1926RSPSA.110..738O. doi:10.1098/rspa.1926.0044. JSTOR 94464.
- Owens, John Switzer; Mchaffy, Robert Pentland (1932). Smoke and Fumes Nuisance from Road Vehicles. Manchester: National Society for Clean Air.
