= Michael E. McIntyre =

English mathematician (born 1941)

Michael E. McIntyre FRS
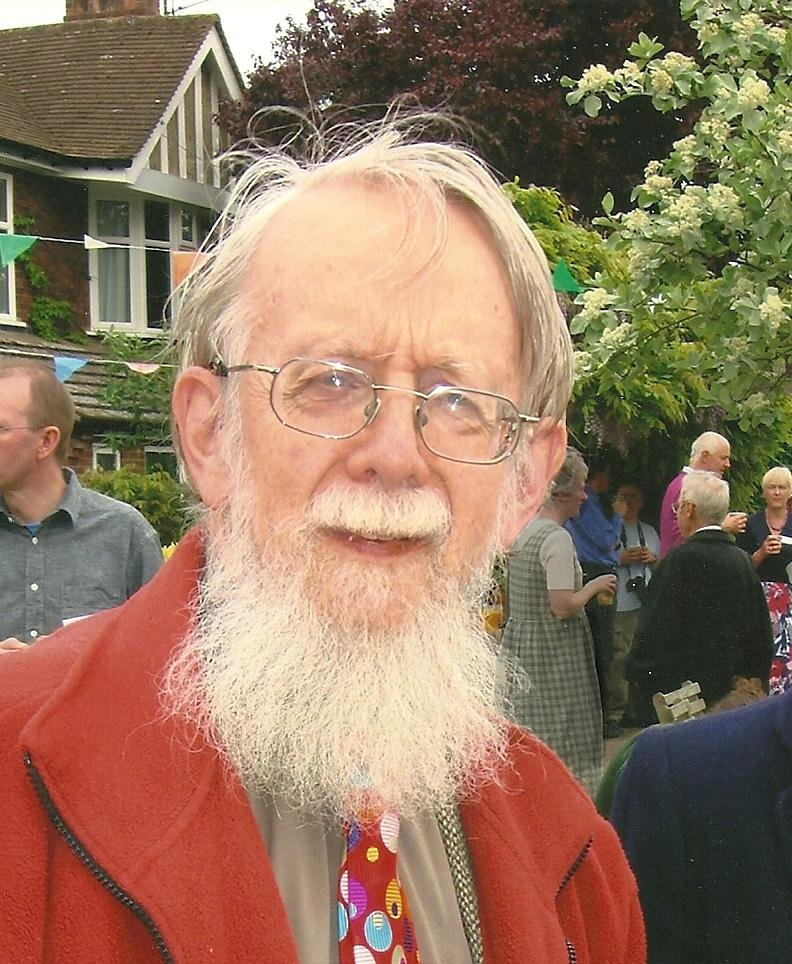
- McIntyre in 2012
- Born: 28 July 1941 (age 85); Sydney, Australia
- Education: University of Otago (BSc.)
- Spouse: Ruth McIntyre
- Awards: Carl-Gustaf Rossby Research Medal, 1987; Julius Bartels Medal, 1999; Symons Gold Medal, 2023
- Scientific career
- Fields: Applied mathematics, meteorology, atmospheric dynamics, musical acoustics
- Doctoral advisor: Francis Bretherton

Michael Edgeworth McIntyre FRS (born 28 July 1941) is a mathematician and professor emeritus of Atmospheric Dynamics.

McIntyre has contributed to the fundamental understanding of geophysical fluid dynamics in the Earth's atmosphere, oceans and the Sun's Interior. McIntyre is also known for his contributions to the physics of stringed musical instruments and has published several works on lucidity and science. He is a Fellow of the Royal Society and is the holder of the Carl-Gustaf Rossby Research Medal, the highest honour of the American Meteorological Society, and the Julius Bartels Medal of the European Geophysical Society.

He also received the 2023 Symons Gold Medal from the Royal Meteorological Society for distinguished work in the field of meteorological science.

== Research ==
In the field of fluid dynamics and atmospheric science, McIntyre, together with Peter H. Haynes, established the Impermeability Theorem for potential vorticity (PV), which states that there can be no net transport of PV across isentropic surfaces, and that PV can neither be created nor destroyed within a volume bounded by isentropic surfaces. In light of the aforementioned result, PV substance, which corresponds to PV multiplied by the mass density in isentropic coordinates, integrated over a volume of an isentropic layer, is either diluted or concentrated by diabatic mass flux through the isentropic layer bounds.

== Books ==
In 2021, he published a book, titled "Science, Music, and Mathematics: The Deepest Connections" which draws on his experience as a musician as well as a scientist. A wide variety of topics is covered including, for instance, how the skilful use of language can be informed by the way music works, and what science can and cannot tell us about the climate problem and its uncertainties. A second edition of the book was published in August 2023.
