= Waterloo, London =

Coordinates: 51.5013°N 0.1120°W

Waterloo
- Location within Greater London
- OS grid reference: TQ311797
  - Charing Cross: 1 mi (1.6 km) W
- London borough: Lambeth
- Ceremonial county: Greater London
- Region: London
- Country: England
- Sovereign state: United Kingdom
- Post town: LONDON
- Postcode district: SE1
- Dialling code: 020
- Police: Metropolitan
- Fire: London
- Ambulance: London
- UK Parliament: Vauxhall and Camberwell Green
- London Assembly: Lambeth and Southwark

Waterloo (/ˌwɔːtərˈluː/) is a district in Central London, and part of the Waterloo and South Bank ward of the London Borough of Lambeth. It is situated 1 mile (1.6 km) east of Charing Cross. The area is part of the We Are Waterloo business improvement district which includes The Cut and the Old Vic and Young Vic theatres. It includes some sections of the London Borough of Southwark.

== Marsh ==
The area was marshland towards the northern tip of the ancient parish of Lambeth. It was known as Lambeth Marshe, but was drained in the 18th century and is remembered in the Lower Marsh street name.

== Notable places ==
Waterloo is connected to the Strand area on the north bank of the River Thames by Waterloo Bridge. The first bridge on the site was opened in 1817 and the current bridge was opened in 1945. The bridge was named to commemorate the Battle of Waterloo in 1815. Waterloo Road also dates from this time, built on land belonging to the Archbishop of Canterbury. St John's, Waterloo was constructed from 1822 by the Commissioners for Building New Churches as the population of the parish of Lambeth had significantly increased. After the opening of Waterloo railway station in 1848 via the Nine Elms to Waterloo Viaduct the locality around the station and Lower Marsh became known as Waterloo. The boundary of the ecclesiastical parish of St John Waterloo established in 1824 was formed by the River Thames in the north and west, approximated Westminster Bridge Road in the south, and followed the boundary with Southwark in the east.

The public library in Waterloo was constructed in 1893. It remained open until the early 1960s when it was vacated due to its poor condition. The building now houses the Waterloo Action Centre.

The Catholic St Patrick's Church was built in 1897 and designed by Frederick Walters. Roupell Street is noted for its well-preserved Georgian housing and is often used as a TV and film location.

== Notable people ==
- Evelyn Campbell (actress) (1868 – ?), stage actress
- Frankie Fraser (1923–2014), malefactor
