= Frank Pasquill =

English meteorologist

- Born: 8 September 1914; Trimdon, County Durham, England
- Died: 15 October 1994 (aged 80)
- Education: University College, Durham
- Known for: Atmospheric diffusion
- Awards: Symons Gold Medal from the Royal Meteorological Society, Fellow of the Royal Society
- Scientific career
- Fields: Meteorology
- Workplaces: Meteorological Office

Frank Pasquill FRS (8 September 1914 – 15 October 1994) was an English meteorologist at the Meteorological Office who worked throughout his career in the field of atmospheric diffusion and micrometeorology. He retired as Deputy Chief Scientific Officer. He was a fellow of the Royal Society.

== Biography ==
Frank Pasquill was the son of Joseph and Elizabeth (née Rudd) Pasquill. His father was a miner. Frank attended secondary school in Hartlepool. He was the first in his family to obtain a secondary education.

He attended University College, Durham and earned First Class Honours in physics in 1935. He was awarded a two-year fellowship at University College to pursue further studies.

In 1937, he married Margaret Alice Turnbull. They had two daughters in the 57-year marriage.

He worked from 1937 to 1943 at the Chemical Defence Establishment of the Meteorological Office at Porton Down. His main work was the measurement of the evaporation of liquids in turbulent air streams. He conducted both wind-tunnel and field measurements. He modified O.G. Sutton's equations based on these experiments and the results are now known as the Sutton-Pasquill model of evaporation.

From 1943 to 1946, he worked in Queensland, Australia on classified work on the dispersion of toxic agents. In 1946, he returned to head a new unit of the Meteorological Office at Cambridge. He conducted field measurements on evaporation and obtained vertical profiles of the turbulent fluxes of heat and water vapor.

In 1950 he was awarded the D.Sc. from the University of Durham. He was assigned to the Atomic Energy Research Establishment at Harwell. He worked with N.G. Stewart on the dispersion of radionuclides from nuclear plants and from the atomic testing.

In 1954, he returned to Porton Down to conduct field measurements on the structure of atmospheric turbulence and the dispersion of pollutants. He developed a simple method for assessing atmospheric stability based on wind speed, solar radiation, cloud cover, and time of day. This resulted in the Pasquill stability classes A (very unstable) through F (very stable). In addition, he developed curves that are now interpreted as the vertical and horizontal dispersion coefficients, σ_{z} and σ_{y}.

In 1961, he transferred to the Micrometeorological Branch at Bracknell. He was promoted to Deputy Chief Scientific Officer in 1966 and in 1970 headed a research branch in boundary-layer meteorology.

He retired in 1974. He spent a year at Pennsylvania State University and North Carolina State University as a visiting professor. At these institutions, he worked with Hans Panofsky, Kenneth Calder, Frank Gifford, and Robert McCormick.

He was the author of a classic book in atmospheric diffusion. He was editor of the Quarterly Journal of the Royal Meteorological Society. He was president of the Royal Meteorological Society from 1970 to 1972. Pasquill was named a Fellow of the Royal Society in 1977. He was elected an Honorary Member of the Royal Meteorological Society in 1978 and was awarded its Symons Gold Medal in 1982. He served as chairman of the Central Electricity Generating Board's Advisory Committee on Environmental Research from 1962 to 1980.

== Books ==
- F. Pasquill, Atmospheric Diffusion: The Dispersion of Windborne Material from Industrial and other Sources, D. Van Norstand Company, Ltd., London, 1962.
- F. Pasquill, Atmospheric Diffusion: The Dispersion of Windborne Material from Industrial and other Sources, 2nd ed., D. Van Norstand Company, Ltd., London, 1974.
- F. Pasquill and F.B. Smith, Atmospheric Diffusion, 3rd ed., John Wiley & Sons, Ltd., New York, 1983.
