= Robert Houze =

American atmospheric scientist

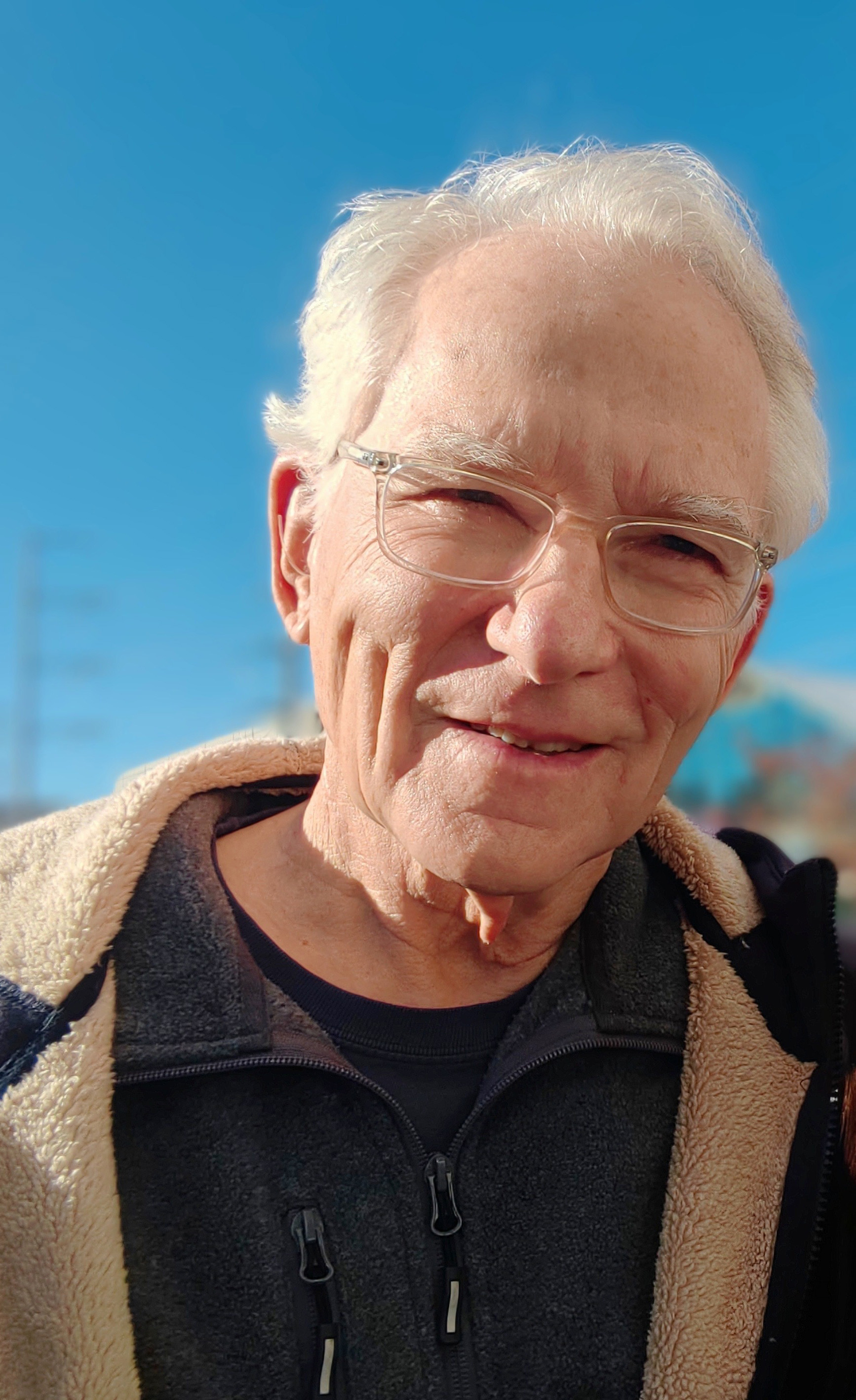
- Born: 1945 (age 80–81)
- Title: Professor Emeritus of Atmospheric Sciences, University of Washington, and Laboratory Fellow, Pacific Northwest National Laboratory
- Awards: Symons Gold Medal of the Royal Meteorological Society (2014); Carl-Gustaf Rossby Research Medal, American Meteorological Society(2006) Fellow of American Geophysical Union, American Meteorological Society, Royal Meteorological Society, and American Association for the Advancement of Science

Academic background
- Education: B.S., M.S. and Ph.D. in Meteorology
- Alma mater: Massachusetts Institute of Technology; Texas A&M University

Academic work
- Institutions: University of Washington

Robert A. Houze, Jr., is an American atmospheric scientist, researcher, author, and Professor Emeritus of Atmospheric Sciences at the University of Washington where he led a research team known as the Mesoscale Group for 46 years. He is known for his participation and leadership in international field projects employing meteorological radar and research aircraft around the world in the tropics and midlatitudes and for serving on science teams for three NASA satellites equipped with radar for the global study of clouds and precipitation. The predominant areas of his research are tropical convective clouds, extreme storms, flooding in the Asian Monsoon, tropical cyclones, and midlatitude frontal systems in mountainous regions. His projects were sponsored by NSF, NASA, DOE, and NOAA.

Houze has published over 200 research articles and has authored a comprehensive book on the physics and dynamics of all types of clouds in the atmosphere entitled Cloud Dynamics, Second Edition. In 2017, the Robert A. Houze Jr. Symposium was organized to honor him at the American Meteorological Society's Annual Meeting. In 2025, he received the Society's highest recognition, that of Honorary Member.

== Education and career ==
Born in Texas in 1945, Houze grew up in College Station, near Texas A&M University, where he received a B.S. in Meteorology in 1967. He then attended the Massachusetts Institute of Technology (MIT), from which he received an M.S. in Meteorology in 1969, followed by a Ph.D. in Meteorology in 1972. At MIT, his mentor was Pauline Austin, a pioneer of using radar to study weather. After completing his Ph.D., Houze joined the University of Washington as an assistant professor in 1972 and rose to the level of full professor in 1983. In 1988-89, he taught at the Swiss Federal Institute of Technology in Zürich as a Guest Professor. During his time as a professor, he has mentored 25 Ph.D.s.

Houze is a Fellow of the American Meteorological Society and the Royal Meteorological Society. In 2006, he was awarded the American Meteorological Society’s highest research award, the Carl-Gustaf Rossby Research Medal. In 2014, he received the Royal Meteorological Society's highest research award, the Symons Gold Medal. He is a Fellow of the American Geophysical Union and of the American Association for the Advancement of Science.

== Research and Work ==
When he arrived at the University of Washington in 1972, Houze began developing what became known as his Mesoscale Group. With this group, he conducted research for nearly five decades. In 1974, he participated in the Global Atmospheric Research Programme’s Atlantic Tropical Experiment (GATE)—the largest field campaign ever to study weather. In GATE, he was on board a ship instrumented with radar, and was one of the first to use radar to document a tropical squall line. Soon after GATE, he joined the international Monsoon Experiment (MONEX), in which he conducted radar studies on clouds in the winter monsoon in Malaysia and summer monsoon of India in 1978-79. The MONEX project was one of the first field campaigns to collect airborne radar data.

The GATE and MONEX experiences launched a career of using radar on ships, islands and aircraft in field campaigns around the world — in northern Australia, the Solomon Islands, the Maldives, the Italian Alps, and various locations in the U.S. — to study thunderstorms over Kansas, fronts passing over the Cascade and Olympic Mountains, and to fly into hurricanes over the Gulf, Atlantic, and Pacific Oceans.

== Retirement ==
In retirement, Professor Houze has written a non-technical book, Tropical Sojourns 1974-2011, bout the life lessons learned from the people and places he worked in the tropics.

== Awards and honors ==
- 1982 - Editor’s Award, American Meteorological Society
- 1982 - Clarence Leroy Meisinger Award, American Meteorological Society
- 1983 - Fellow of the American Meteorological Society
- 2001 - Highly Cited Researcher, Institute of Scientific Information
- 2006 - Carl-Gustaf Rossby Research Medal, American Meteorological Society
- 2012 - Fellow of the American Geophysical Union
- 2012 - Bjerknes Lecture, American Geophysical Union
- 2013 - Fellow of the American Association for the Advancement of Science
- 2014 - Symons Gold Medal of the Royal Meteorological Society
- 2014 - Fellow of the Royal Meteorological Society
- 2025 - Honorary Member of the American Meteorological Society

== Publications ==
=== Books ===
- Cloud Dynamics (1993)
- A Half Century of Progress in Meteorology: A Tribute to Richard Reed (2003)
- Cloud Dynamics 2nd Edition (2014)
- Tropical Sojourns 1974-2011 (2024)

=== Selected papers ===
- Structure and dynamics of a tropical squall-line system. Monthly Weather Review (1977)
- Convection in GATE. Reviews of Geophysics (1981)
- Cloud clusters and large-scale vertical motions in the tropics. Journal of the Meteorological Society of Japan (1982)
- Observed structure of mesoscale convective systems and implications for large‐scale heating. Quarterly Journal of the Royal Meteorological Society (1989)
- Mesoscale organization of springtime rainstorms in Oklahoma. Monthly Weather Review (1990)
- Stratiform precipitation in regions of convection: A meteorological paradox? Bulletin of the American Meteorological Society (1997)
- Stratiform rain in the tropics as seen by the TRMM precipitation radar. Journal of Climate (2003)
- Mesoscale convective systems. Reviews of Geophysics (2004)
- Clouds in tropical cyclones. Monthly Weather Review (2010)
- Anomalous atmospheric events leading to the Summer 2010 floods in Pakistan. Bulletin of the American Meteorological Society (2011)
- Orogenic convection in subtropical South America as seen by the TRMM satellite, Monthly Weather Review (2011)
- Orographic effects on precipitating clouds. Reviews of Geophysics (2012)
- The variable nature of convection in the tropics and subtropics: A legacy of 16 years of the Tropical Rainfall Measuring Mission (TRMM) satellite. Reviews of Geophysics (2015)
- The Olympic Mountains Experiment (OLYMPEX). Bulletin of the American Meteorological Society (2017)
- 100 Years of Research on Mesoscale Convective Systems. Meteorological Monographs (2018)
