= St Patrick's Church, Waterloo =

St Patrick's Church
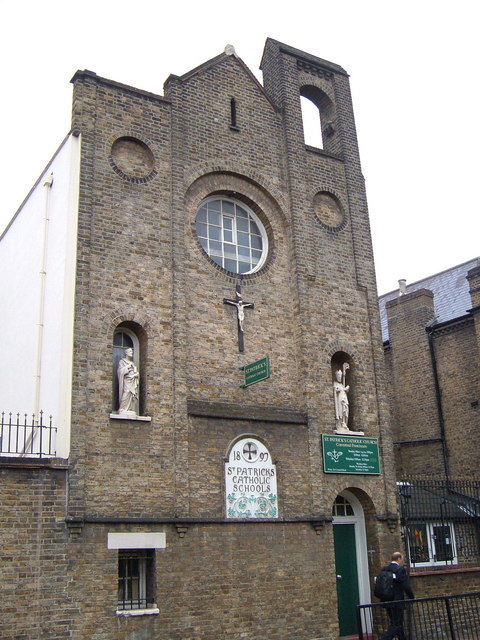
- St Patrick's Church
- 51.504822°N 0.110799°W
- OS grid reference: TQ 31214 80123
- Location: Waterloo, London
- Country: England
- Denomination: Roman Catholic
- Religious institute: Order of Friars Minor Conventual
- Website: thegreyfriars.org/london

Architecture
- Architect: Frederick Walters
- Style: Romanesque Revival
- Years built: 1897

Administration
- Archdiocese: Southwark
- Deanery: Cathedral
- Parish: Waterloo

St Patrick's Church is a Roman Catholic parish church in Waterloo, London. It was built in 1897, designed by Frederick Walters. A Victorian Romanesque Revival style building that houses both the church and a school, it is located on the corner of Cornwall Street and Secker Street, to the east of St John's Church, Waterloo. It is served by the Franciscan Order of Friars Minor Conventual, and it is their only church in London.

== History ==
From 1888 to 1905, Frederick Walters was working on the redecoration of St George's Cathedral, Southwark. While he was there, he designed St Patrick's Church in Waterloo. In 1897, St Patrick's church building was constructed to house both a school and a chapel for the local Catholic population. Originally, to say Mass a priest would come from the cathedral to the chapel. The church is on the upper floor and the school is on the ground floor. However, Walters' original designs for the building, kept in the drawing collection of the Royal Institute of British Architects show that he wanted a tower attached to the building the church on the ground floor and the school on the upper floor. It is unknown why the plans were changed.

== Parish ==
In 1964, the Conventual Franciscans came to serve the local parish. They have a friary nearby and it has since become their administrative centre in Britain. There are three Sunday Masses in the church, at 5:00pm on Saturday, and 9:00am and 11:00am on Sunday.

== Church ==
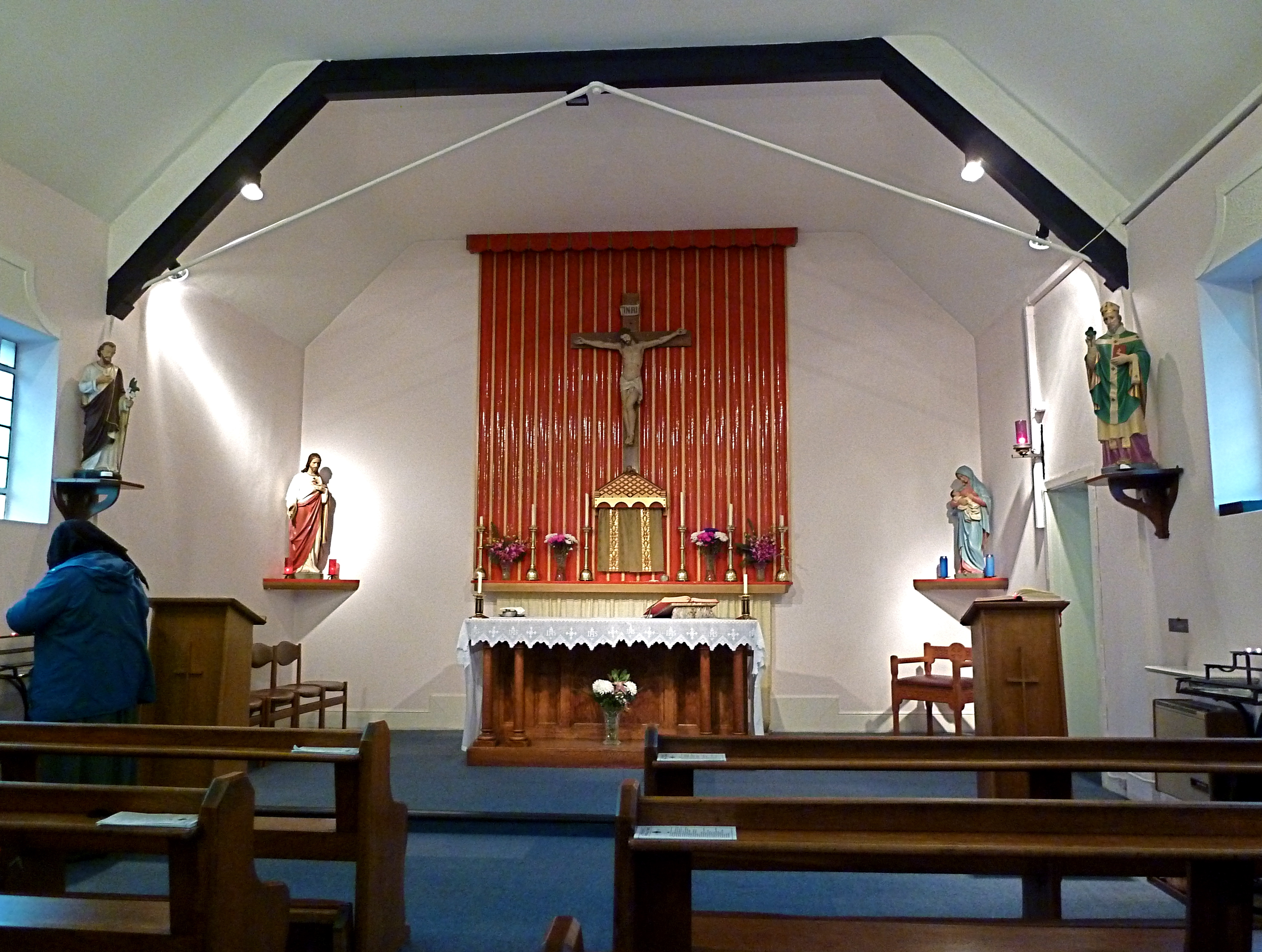
Interior

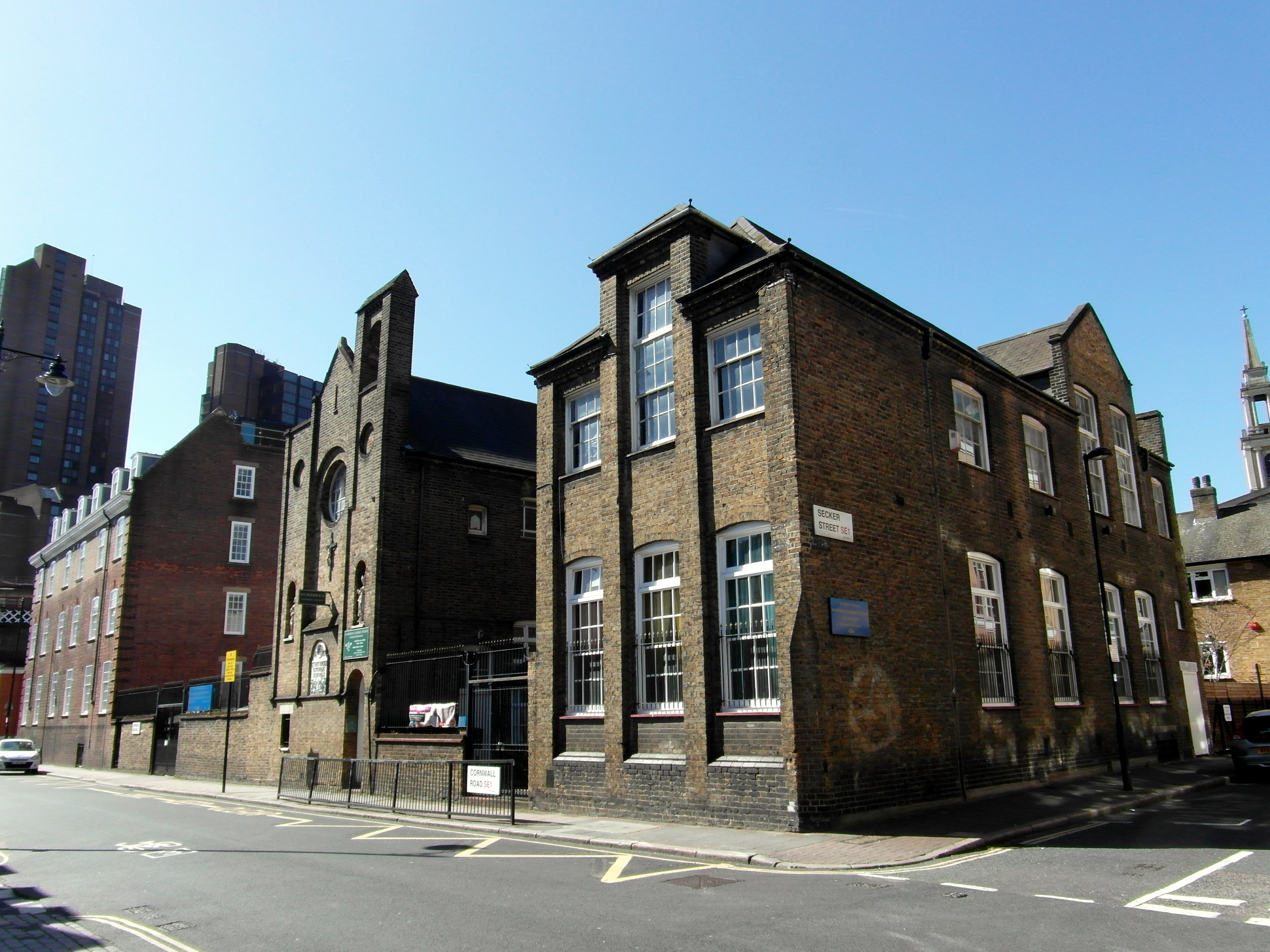
School

== See also ==
- Archdiocese of Southwark.
