= Symons Gold Medal =

British meteorology award

The Symons Gold Medal is awarded biennially by the Royal Meteorological Society for distinguished work in the field of meteorological science.

It was established in 1901 in memory of George James Symons, a notable British meteorologist.

== Recipients ==
Source (1978-): Royal Metereological Society

- 2024 James Murphy
- 2022 Michael E. McIntyre
- 2020 Sue Grimmond
- 2018 Clive D. Rodgers
- 2016 John Michael Wallace
- 2014 Robert A. Houze
- 2012 Timothy Barnett
- 2010 John F. B. Mitchell
- 2008 Adrian J. Simmons
- 2006 Sir Brian J. Hoskins
- 2004 John S. A. Green
- 2002 Raymond Hide
- 2000 Keith A. Browning
- 1998 Philip Gerald Drazin
- 1996 Klaus Hasselmann
- 1994 John L. Monteith
- 1992 Douglas Lilly
- 1990 John T. Houghton
- 1988 David Atlas
- 1986 Hubert H. Lamb
- 1984 Christian E. Junge
- 1982 Frank Pasquill
- 1980 Joseph Smagorinsky
- 1978 Frank H. Ludlam
- 1976 Kirill Yakovlevitch Kondratyev
- 1975 Sir John Mason
- 1973 Edward Norton Lorenz
- 1971 John Sawyer
- 1969 Sverre Petterssen
- 1967 Charles Henry Brian Priestley
- 1965 Sydney Chapman
- 1963 Percival Albert Sheppard
- 1961 Jule Gregory Charney
- 1959 Sir Oliver Graham Sutton
- 1957 Erik Palmén
- 1955 Reginald Cockcroft Sutcliffe
- 1953 Carl-Gustav Arvid Rossby
- 1951 Geoffrey Ingram Taylor
- 1949 Tor Bergeron
- 1947 David Brunt
- 1944 Charles William Blythe Normand
- 1942 John Switzer Owens
- 1940 Jacob Aall Bonnevie Bjerknes
- 1938 Gordon M.B. Dobson
- 1936 Wilhelm Schmidt
- 1934 Gibert Thomas Walker
- 1932 Vilhelm F. K. Bjerknes
- 1930 George C. Simpson
- 1928 Hugo Hergesell
- 1926 Ernest Gold
- 1924 Takematsu Okada
- 1922 Henry George Lyons
- 1920 Hugo Hildebrand Hildebrandsson
- 1918 Hugh Robert Mill
- 1916 ?
- 1914 William Henry Dines
- 1912 Cleveland Abbe
- 1910 William Napier Shaw
- 1908 Léon Teisserenc de Bort
- 1906 Sir Richard Strachey
- 1904 Julius Hann
- 1902 Alexander Buchan

== See also ==
- List of meteorology awards
- List of prizes named after people
