= David Brunt =

Welsh meteorologist (1886–1965)

Sir David Brunt KBE FRS
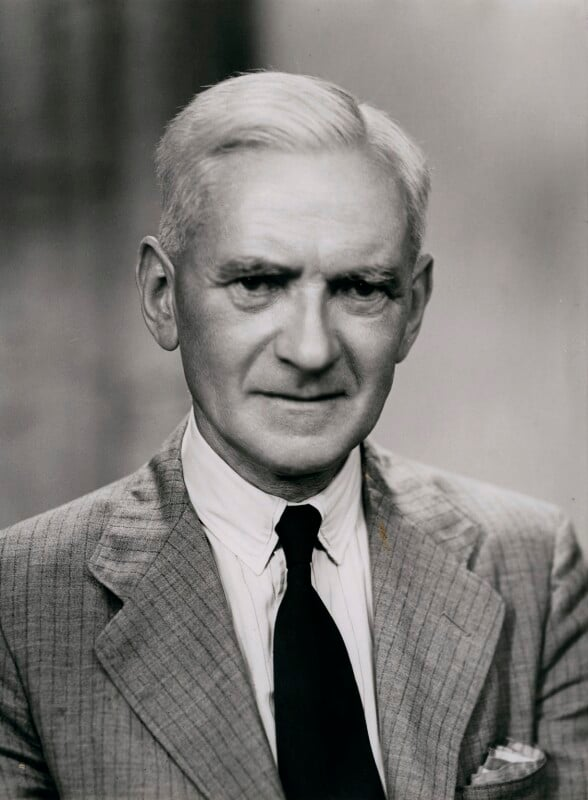
- Brunt in 1949
- Born: 17 June 1886; Staylittle, Montgomeryshire, Wales
- Died: 5 February 1965 (aged 78)
- Education: University College of Wales, Trinity College, Cambridge
- Known for: Brunt–Väisälä frequency
- Spouse: Claudia Mary Elizabeth Roberts (m. 1915)
- Awards: Symons Gold Medal (1947); Royal Medal (1944)
- Scientific career
- Fields: Meteorology

Sir David Brunt, KBE, FRS (17 June 1886 – 5 February 1965) was a Welsh meteorologist. He was Professor of Meteorology at Imperial College, London from 1934 to 1952. He was vice-president of the Royal Society from 1949 to 1957. The Brunt Ice Shelf in Antarctica is named after him.

He was born in Staylittle, Montgomeryshire, Wales, the youngest of the nine children of farmworker John Brunt. His father moved the family to the mining district In Monmouthshire to work as a coal miner. David attended the local Abertillery School from 1899 to 1904. In 1904 he secured a scholarship to enter the University College of Wales at Aberystwyth, where he studied mathematics, physics and chemistry, gaining a first class honours degree in mathematics in 1907. He then went to Trinity College, Cambridge and in 1909 was elected to the Isaac Newton studentship at the National Solar Physics Observatory.

After leaving Cambridge he spent a year as a lecturer in mathematics at the University of Birmingham and two years in a similar post at the Monmouthshire Training College, Caerleon. In 1916 he enlisted in the Royal Engineers (meteorological section) and during the war years did important work related to atmospherical conditions at low levels in chemical warfare. He later became meteorologist to the Air Force. After demobilisation he joined the Meteorological Office which in 1921 became the Air Ministry. He continued his personal research and accepted Sir Napier Shaw's invitation to join him as part-time professor of meteorology at the Imperial College, London. After the retirement of Sir Napier Shaw, Brunt became the first full-time professor of meteorology in Britain, holding the chair from 1934 to 1952. Two years later was elected a Fellow of the college. He independently co-discovered the Brunt–Väisälä frequency.

Between 1936 and 1939 he contributed to a theoretical understanding of fog dispersal, information used in the development of the FIDO fog dispersal system.

He was elected a Fellow of the Royal Society (FRS) in 1939 and was awarded their Royal Medal in 1944. He went on to serve as their secretary from 1948 to 1957 and as their vice-president from 1949 to 1957.

He served as president of the Royal Meteorological Society from 1942 to 1944 and received both their Buchan prize and their 1947 Symons Gold Medal. He was also president of the Physical Society from 1945 to 1947.

He was made a Knight Bachelor in 1949 and appointed Knight Commander of the Order of the British Empire (KBE) in 1959.

== Private life ==
While he was working at Caerleon in 1915, he married Claudia Mary Elizabeth Roberts of Nant-y-glo, Monmouthshire, who had been a fellow student both at Abertillery and Aberystwyth. They had one son who died unmarried.
