= Photoelectric flame photometer =

Laboratory device

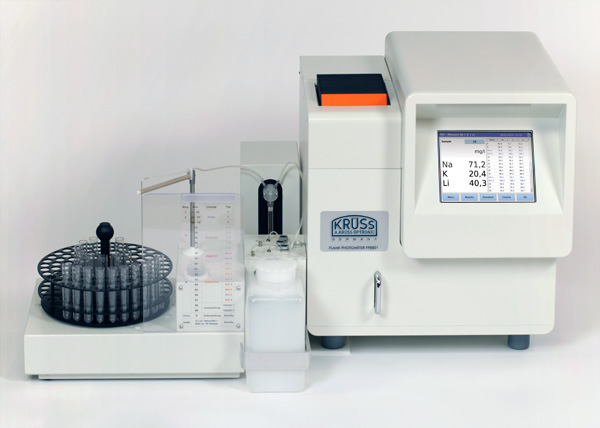
Flame photometer FP8800 for simultaneous determination of up to 4 alkali and alkali earth element concentrations in aqueous samples. Courtesy of A.KRÜSS Optronic

Flame photometry is a type of atomic emission spectroscopy. It is also known as flame emission spectroscopy. A photoelectric flame photometer is an instrument used in inorganic chemical analysis to determine the concentration of certain metal ions, among them sodium, potassium, lithium, and calcium. Group 1 (alkali metals) and Group 2 (alkaline earth metals) are quite sensitive to flame photometry due to their low excitation energies.

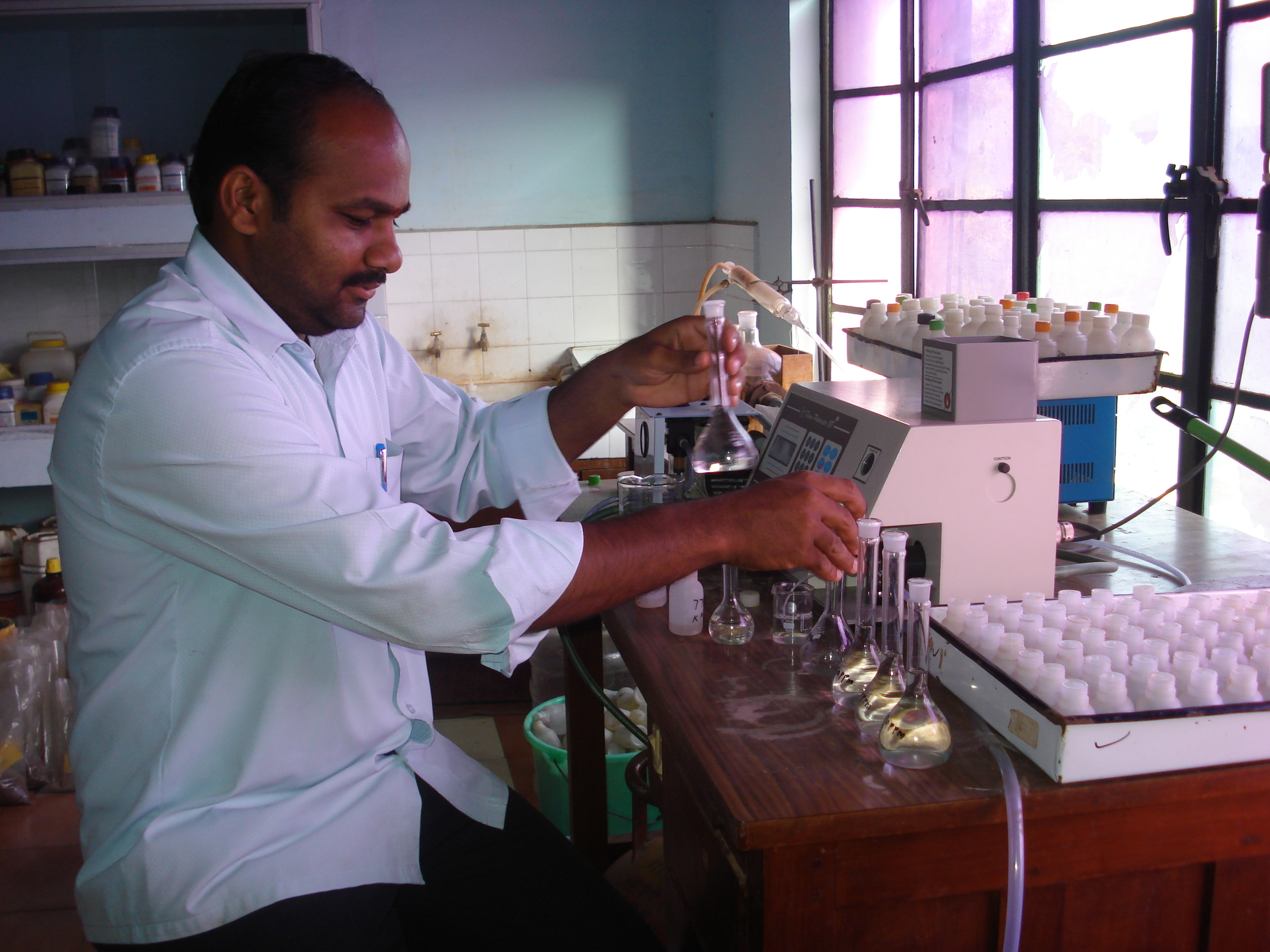
Analysis of samples by flame photometer

In principle, it is a controlled flame test with the intensity of the flame color quantified by photoelectric circuitry. The intensity of the color will depend on the energy that had been absorbed by the atoms that was sufficient to vaporise them. The sample is introduced to the flame at a constant rate. Filters select which colours the photometer detects and exclude the influence of other ions. Before use, the device requires calibration with a series of standard solutions of the ion to be tested.

Flame photometry is crude but inexpensive compared to flame emission spectroscopy or ICP-AES, where the emitted light is analyzed with a monochromator. Its status is similar to that of the colorimeter (which uses filters) compared to the spectrophotometer (which uses a monochromator). It also has the range of metals that could be analysed and the limit of detection are also considered
