= Napier Shaw =

British meteorologist (1854–1945)

Sir Napier Shaw
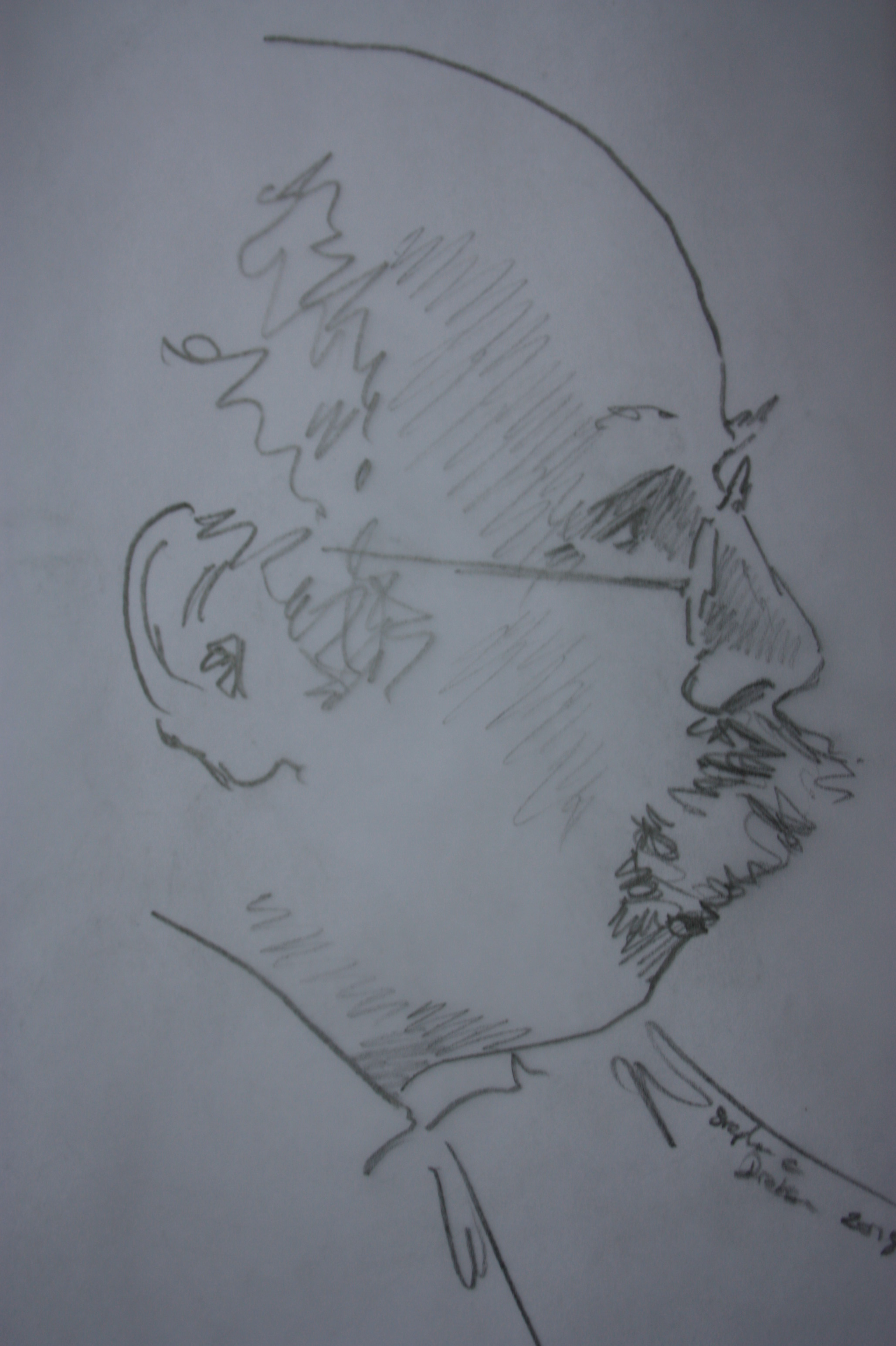
- Born: 4 March 1854; Birmingham, England, UK
- Died: 23 March 1945 (aged 91); London
- Known for: Tephigram
- Awards: Royal Medal (1923); Buys Ballot Medal (1923)
- Scientific career
- Fields: Meteorologist

Sir William Napier Shaw FRS (4 March 1854 – 23 March 1945) was a British meteorologist and academic. He introduced the tephigram, a diagram for evaluating convective instability in the atmosphere. He also served as president of the International Meteorological Committee and Royal Meteorological Society.

== Early life ==
Shaw was born at 84 Vyse Street in Birmingham the son of Charles Thomas Shaw, a goldsmith and jeweller, and his wife, Kezia Lauden. He was educated at King Edward's School, Birmingham.

He studied at Cambridge University graduating MA in 1876, then at the University of Berlin in Berlin, Germany.

== Career ==
Returning to Britain, Shaw began as a demonstrator in physics at the Cavendish Laboratory of University of Cambridge in 1879. In 1887, he began lecturing in experimental physics. In 1898, he became assistant director of the Cavendish Laboratory.

In 1891, he was elected a Fellow of the Royal Society. In 1900, he became secretary of the Meteorological Council. From 1905 to 1907, he was director of the Meteorological Office. In 1907, he became the first professor of meteorology at Imperial College, London.

In 1911 he served as president of the International Meteorological Committee, forerunner of the World Meteorological Organization. In 1915, he developed the tephigram. He was knighted by King George V later that year.

He was president of the Royal Meteorological Society from 1918 to 1919. In 1924, he was an invited speaker of the ICM in Toronto. Shaw also studied air pollution and was the first to study and discuss smog and look at its health problems; in 1925, he co-authored the book The Smoke Problem of Great Cities with John Switzer Owens.

In 1933, he was elected an honorary Fellow of the Royal Society of Edinburgh. Shaw retired in 1924 aged 70.

== Honours and awards ==
- 1910: Symons Gold Medal of the Royal Meteorological Society
- 1923: Royal Medal by the Royal Society.

== Personal life ==
In 1885 he married Sarah Jane Dugdale Harland (d.1923). They had no children. Shaw died on 23 March 1945 in London at the age of 91.

== Select publications ==
- Practical Physics (1893)
- Forecasting Weather (1911)
- Articles on "Dew", "Fog","Squall" and "Sunshine" in the Encyclopaedia Britannica (1911)
- The Smoke Problem of Great Cities (1925)
- Manual of Meteorology (1926) plus several later editions
