= Diffusion tube =

Pollution measuring device

A diffusion tube is a scientific device that passively samples the concentration of one or more gases in the air, commonly used to monitor average air pollution levels over a period ranging from days to about a month. Diffusion tubes are widely used by local authorities for monitoring air quality in urban areas, in citizen science pollution-monitoring projects carried out by community groups and schools, and in indoor environments such as mines and museums.

== Construction and operation ==
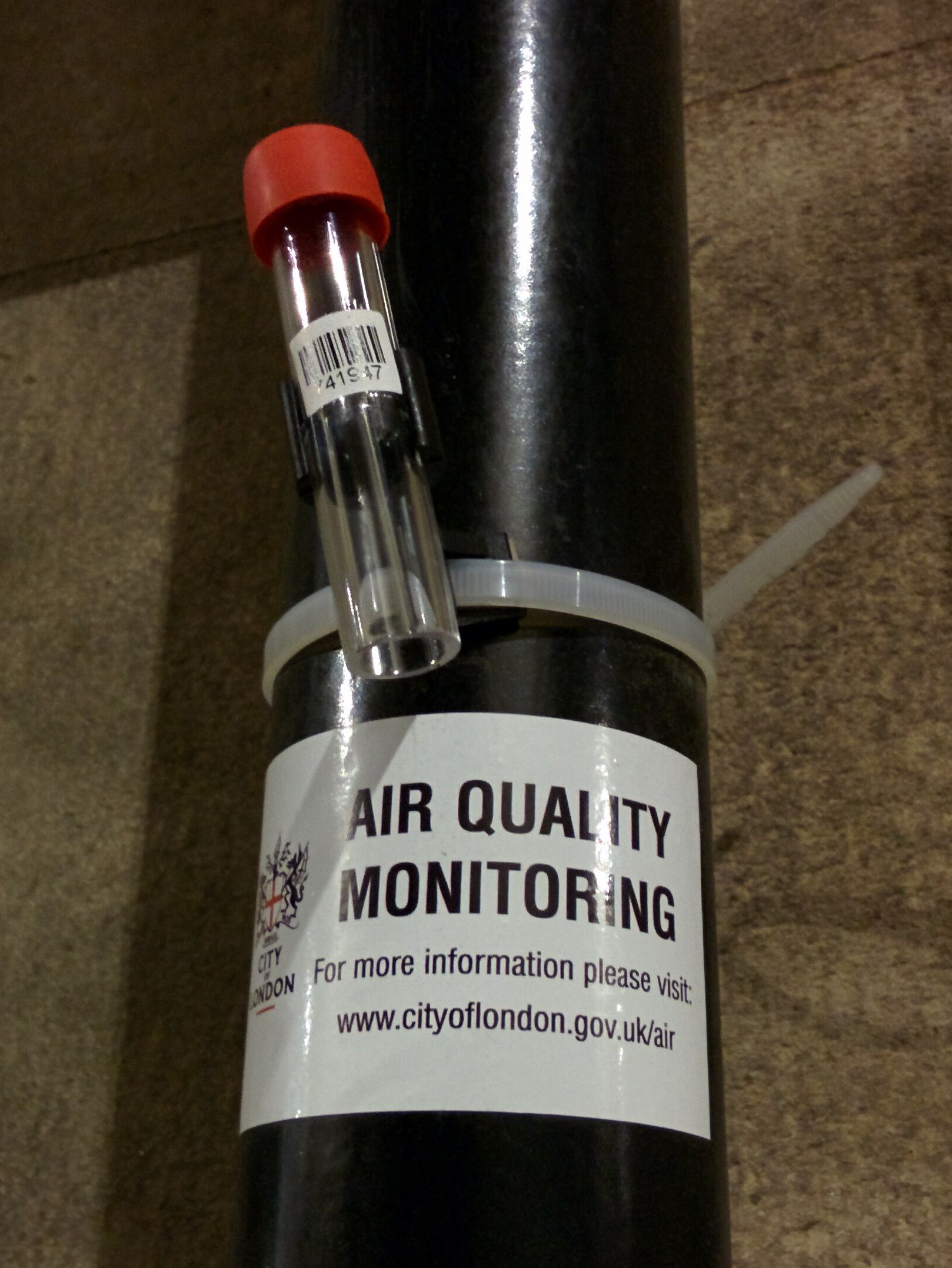
A typical diffusion tube attached, by a cable tie, to a drainpipe. The bottom end is open to the atmosphere. Pollution is captured by a chemical inside the red cap at the top.

A diffusion tube consists of a small, hollow, usually transparent, acrylic or polypropylene plastic tube, roughly 70mm long, with a cap at each end. One of the caps (coloured white) is either completely removed to activate the tube (in the case of nitrogen dioxide sampling) or contains a filter allowing in just the gas being studied. The other cap (a different colour) contains metal mesh discs coated with a chemical reagent that absorbs the gas being studied as it enters the tube. Tubes that work this way are also known as Palmes tubes after their inventor, American chemist Edward Palmes, who described using such a tube as a personal air quality sensor in 1976.

During operation, the tube is opened and vertically fastened with cable ties to something like a lamp-post or road sign, with the open end facing down, and the closed, coloured cap at the top. The gas being monitored, which is at a higher concentration in the atmosphere, diffuses into the bottom of the tube and is quickly absorbed by the chemical cap. As it is absorbed, the process of diffusion continues. After a fixed period of time (typically from two weeks to a month), the tube is sealed up and sent away to a laboratory for analysis. The atmospheric concentration of the gas being studied can be calculated using the amount captured and Fick's laws of diffusion.

Diffusion tubes can be used to sample various different gases, including oxides of nitrogen (nitrogen dioxide and nitric oxide), sulphur dioxide, ammonia, and ozone. Although tubes sampling these gases all work through the same process of molecular diffusion, there are important differences. Nitrogen dioxide tubes use triethanolamine, TEOA (often mistakenly abbreviated as TEA, which actually refers to triethylamine), as the absorbing (reagent) chemical, for example, while hydrogen sulphide tubes are opaque (rather than transparent) to prevent ultraviolet light from degrading the chemicals inside. Some types of tube can sample multiple gases at the same time.

== Advantages and disadvantages ==
Diffusion tubes are reasonably accurate, relatively cheap, easy to use, extremely compact, passive (they need no power source), and have a fairly long shelf life; with careful positioning, they can be deployed more or less anywhere, indoors or outdoors. They give a reasonable indication of the long-term, average concentration of a pollutant gas, such as nitrogen dioxide, and they make it easy to compare average pollution levels in different places or at different times. Often, a series of tubes are mounted in exactly the same place for consecutive months of the year to enable longer-term comparisons of pollution levels. It's also common for local authorities to mount a number of tubes in different places over the same time period so pollution hotspots in towns and cities can be identified.

Since diffusion tubes are designed to be left in place for days or weeks at a time, they don't indicate shorter-term fluctuations of the pollutant being studied, such as the rising and falling levels of gas during the day, the difference between one day and the next or between weekdays and weekends, or the number of times guideline pollution levels are exceeded while they're in place. They're also much less accurate than the highly sensitive, automated monitoring equipment used in roadside pollution monitoring cabins. Sources of inaccuracy include air turbulence (caused by things like wind movements or air conditioners), pollution from building ventilation systems, ultraviolet light (theoretically absorbed by the plastic tube), and other pollutants.
