= List of business improvement districts in London =

List of the business improvement districts in London, England. Kingston First was the first such district in the United Kingdom. There are approximately seventy business improvement districts in London.

BID name	BID type	Area covered	London borough	Established	Website
Angel London	High street/town centre	Angel town centre including Chapel Market	Islington	2007	Official website
Argall Avenue	Industrial	Argall Avenue Industrial Estate	Waltham Forest	2008	Official website
Baker Street Quarter Partnership	High street/town centre	Baker Street	Westminster	2013	Official website
Bayswater Village	High street/town centre	Bayswater town centre including Whiteleys	Westminster	2009	Official website
Beddington	Industrial	Beddington Industrial Area	Sutton	2015	Official website
Better Bankside	High street/town centre	South Bank (west): Bankside from Blackfriars Bridge to London Bridge, including Borough Market, Borough High Street, Tate Modern and the Globe Theatre	Southwark	2005	Official website
Bexleyheath	High street/town centre	Bexleyheath Town Centre	Bexley	2011	Official website
Blue Bermondsey	High street/town centre	Bermondsey	Southwark	2014	Official website
Brixton	High street/town centre	Brixton	Lambeth	2013	Official website
Bromley	High street/town centre	Bromley	Bromley	2016	Official website
Camden Town Unlimited	High street/town centre	Camden Town: Camden High Street and the markets	Camden	2006	Official website
Cheapside Business Alliance	High street/town centre	Cheapside	City of London	2015	Official website
Clapham Business Community	High street/town centre	Clapham	Lambeth	2014	Official website
Croydon	High street/town centre	Croydon	Croydon	2007	Official website
Love Wimbledon	High street/town centre	Wimbledon Town Centre	Merton	2012	Official website
E11	High street/town centre	Leytonstone town centre and industrial units	Waltham Forest	2008	Official website
Ealing Broadway	High street/town centre	Ealing town centre on Broadway	Ealing	2006	Official website
Eastern City	High street/town centre	City of London Fenchurch Street, Monument, Leadenhall, Bishopsgate	City of London	2022	Official website
Euston Town	High street/town centre	Euston	Camden	2016	Official website
Fitzrovia Partnership	High street/town centre	Camden and West End Tottenham Court Road and Charlotte Street, W1	Camden	2012	Official website
Fleet Street Quarter	High street/town centre	Fleet Street, Chancery Lane, Holborn, Ludgate Hill, New Street Square	City of London, City of Westminster	2022	Official website
Fulham Broadway BID	High street/town centre	Fulham Broadway	Hammersmith and Fulham	2018	Official website
Garratt Business Park	Industrial	Garratt Business Park (4 of the 5 units) in Earlsfield	Wandsworth	2009	Official website
Grand Union	High street/town centre	Paddington Station, Paddington Central and surrounding canal	Westminster	2025	Official website
Hainault Business Park	Industrial	Hainault Business Park	Redbridge	2006	Official website
Hammersmith BID	High street/town centre	Hammersmith, including offices, retail and theatres	Hammersmith and Fulham	2006	Official website
Hampstead Village BID	High street/town centre	Hampstead High Street	Camden	2016	Official website
Harrow Town Centre	High street/town centre	Harrow town centre	Harrow	2014	Official website
Heart of London Business Alliance	High street/town centre	West End: Leicester Square and Piccadilly Circus	Westminster	2005	Official website
Ilford	High street/town centre	Ilford town centre, including The Mall Ilford	Redbridge	2009	Official website
Central District Alliance	High street/town centre	Holborn, St Giles, Bloomsbury, Farringdon and Clerkenwell	Camden / Islington	2005	Official website
inStreatham	High street/town centre	Streatham	Lambeth	2013	Official website
Kimpton Industrial Estate	Industrial	Kimpton Industrial Estate	Sutton	2009	Official website
Kingston First	High street/town centre	Kingston town centre, including shopping centres	Kingston upon Thames	2005	Official website
London Riverside	Industrial	Rainham (five adjoining industrial estates and business parks) within London Riverside	Havering	2007	Official website
Marble Arch London	High street/town centre	Northern stretch of Park Lane, Marble Arch, Connaught Village, Seymour Place and Edgware Road to the Marylebone Flyover	Westminster	2016	Official website
New Addington	High street/town centre	New Addington	Croydon	2012	
New West End Company	High street/town centre	West End: Oxford Street, Bond Street and Regent Street	Westminster	2005	Official website
Northbank	High street/town centre	Aldwych, Strand and Trafalgar Square	Westminster	2013	Official website
Orpington 1st	High street/town centre	Orpington town centre	Bromley	2013	Official website
Paddington Now	High street/town centre	Praed Street and environs	Westminster	2005	Official website
Purley BID	High street/town centre	Purley	Croydon	2015	Official website
Sidcup Partners	High street/town centre	Sidcup	Bexley	2018	Official website
South Bank BID	High street/town centre	South Bank	Lambeth/Southwark	2014	Official website
Station to Station	High street/town centre	West Norwood and Tulse Hill	Lambeth	2016	Official website
Stratford Original	High street/town centre	Stratford town centre	Newham	2015	Official website
Successful Sutton	High street/town centre	Sutton town centre	Sutton	2012	Official website
Team London Bridge	High street/town centre	South Bank (east): between London Bridge and Tower Bridge	Southwark	2006	Official website
Try Twickenham	High street/town centre	Twickenham	Richmond upon Thames	2013	Official website
Vauxhall One	High street/town centre	Vauxhall town centre including The Oval	Lambeth	2012	Official website
Victoria	High street/town centre	Victoria area	Westminster	2009	Official website
We Are Waterloo	High street/town centre	Waterloo area, including Lower Marsh, The Cut and the Old Vic and Young Vic theatres	Lambeth (extended into Southwark in 2008)	2006	Official website
West Ealing	High street/town centre	West Ealing	Ealing	2014	Official website
Willow Lane	Industrial	Willow Lane Trading Estate	Merton	2009	Official website
