= Colin O'Dowd =

Irish physicist (born 1966)

- Born: 27 March 1966 (age 60); Galway, Ireland
- Education: University of Galway (B.Sc.); University of Manchester Institute of Science & Technology (Ph.D.)
- Awards: International Smoluchowski Award (2004); Edward Appleton Medal and Prize (2012); Royal Irish Academy Gold Medal in Geosciences (2013); Mason Medal (2016); Presidents Awards for Research Excellence (2018)
- Scientific career
- Workplaces: University of Manchester Institute of Science and Technology; University of Sunderland; University of Helsinki; University of Galway

Colin Dermot O'Dowd (born 27 March 1966) is an Irish physicist and atmospheric scientist.

== Biography ==
O'Dowd matriculated in 1984 at NUI Galway, and graduated there in 1987 with a B.Sc. in physics. He received his Ph.D. in 1992 from UMIST (University of Manchester Institute of Science and Technology). He was from 1992 to 1996 a research associate at UMIST and from 1996 to 2001 a senior research fellow at the University of Sunderland. At the University of Helsinki, he was from 2000 to 2001 a senior scientist and from 2001 to 2002 a professor of physics. At NUI Galway, he was from 2001 to 2004 an adjunct professor of physics, from 2004 to 2005 a lecturer, and from 2006 to 2009 a senior lecturer and is since 2009 a personal (chair) professor of physics. There he is also the director of the Centre for Climate and Air Pollution Studies.

He has been, for a number of years, a highly-cited researcher and is the author or co-author of over 250 scientific publications. From 2000 to 2008 he was the co-editor-in-chief of the Journal of Geophysical Research (Section D: Atmospheres). He has done research on air-sea exchange, atmospheric composition, aerosols, and pollutants, climate change, and biogeochemical cycling.

O'Dowd was elected in 2002 a fellow of the Institute of Physics, in 2003 a fellow of the Royal Meteorological Society, in 2011 a member of the Royal Irish Academy, and in 2018 a member of Academia Europaea. He received in 2004 the Smoluchowski Award of the Gesellschaft für Aerosolforschung (German Association for Aerosol Science), in 2012 the Appleton Award of the Institute of Physics, in 2013 the Gold Medal in Geosciences of the Royal Irish Academy, and in 2016 the Mason Medal of the Royal Meteorological Society.

== Selected publications ==
- O'Dowd, Colin D.; Smith, Michael H.; Consterdine, Ian E.; Lowe, Jason A. (1997). "Marine aerosol, sea-salt, and the marine sulphur cycle: A short review". Atmospheric Environment. 31 (1): 73–80. Bibcode:1997AtmEn..31...73O. doi:10.1016/S1352-2310(96)00106-9. 1997
- O'Dowd, Colin D.; Aalto, Pasi; Hmeri, Kaarle; Kulmala, Markku; Hoffmann, Thorsten (2002). "Atmospheric particles from organic vapours". Nature. 416 (6880): 497–498. doi:10.1038/416497a. PMID 11932734. S2CID 4410584. 2002 (April)
- O'Dowd, Colin D.; Jimenez, Jose L.; Bahreini, Roya; Flagan, Richard C.; Seinfeld, John H.; Hämeri, Kaarle; Pirjola, Liisa; Kulmala, Markku; Jennings, S. Gerard; Hoffmann, Thorsten (2002). "Marine aerosol formation from biogenic iodine emissions". Nature. 417 (6889): 632–636. Bibcode:2002Natur.417..632O. doi:10.1038/nature00775. PMID 12050661. S2CID 4420243. 2002 (June) (over 750 citations)
- Kulmala, M.; Maso, M. Dal; Mäkelä, J. M.; Pirjola, L.; Väkevä, M.; Aalto, P.; Miikkulainen, P.; Hämeri, K.; O'Dowd, C. D. (2001). "On the formation, growth and composition of nucleation mode particles". Tellus B: Chemical and Physical Meteorology. 53 (4): 479–490. Bibcode:2001TellB..53..479K. doi:10.3402/tellusb.v53i4.16622. S2CID 96261315. 2003
- O'Dowd, Colin D.; Facchini, Maria Cristina; Cavalli, Fabrizia; Ceburnis, Darius; Mircea, Mihaela; Decesari, Stefano; Fuzzi, Sandro; Yoon, Young Jun; Putaud, Jean-Philippe (2004). "Biogenically driven organic contribution to marine aerosol". Nature. 431 (7009): 676–680. Bibcode:2004Natur.431..676O. doi:10.1038/nature02959. PMID 15470425. S2CID 4388791. 2004 (over 900 citations)
- McFiggans, G.; Artaxo, P.; Baltensperger, U.; Coe, H.; Facchini, M. C.; Feingold, G.; Fuzzi, S.; Gysel, M.; Laaksonen, A.; Lohmann, U.; Mentel, T. F.; Murphy, D. M.; O'Dowd, C. D.; Snider, J. R.; Weingartner, E. (2006). "The effect of physical and chemical aerosol properties on warm cloud droplet activation". Atmospheric Chemistry and Physics. 6 (9): 2593–2649. Bibcode:2006ACP.....6.2593M. doi:10.5194/acp-6-2593-2006. hdl:20.500.11850/24269. 2006
- O'Dowd, Colin D.; De Leeuw, Gerrit (2007). "Marine aerosol production: A review of the current knowledge". Philosophical Transactions of the Royal Society A: Mathematical, Physical and Engineering Sciences. 365 (1856): 1753–1774. Bibcode:2007RSPTA.365.1753O. doi:10.1098/rsta.2007.2043. PMID 17513261. S2CID 6448300. 2007
- Rosenfeld, Daniel; Lohmann, Ulrike; Raga, Graciela B.; O'Dowd, Colin D.; Kulmala, Markku; Fuzzi, Sandro; Reissell, Anni; Andreae, Meinrat O. (2008). "Flood or Drought: How do Aerosols Affect Precipitation?". Science. 321 (5894): 1309–1313. Bibcode:2008Sci...321.1309R. doi:10.1126/science.1160606. PMID 18772428. S2CID 1170065. 2008 (over 1650 citations)
- Monks, P.S.; et al. (2009). "Atmospheric composition change – global and regional air quality". Atmospheric Environment. 43 (33): 5268–5350. Bibcode:2009AtmEn..43.5268M. doi:10.1016/j.atmosenv.2009.08.021. hdl:10379/12948. 2009 (over 750 citations)
- Wiedensohler, A.; et al. (2012). "Mobility particle size spectrometers: Harmonization of technical standards and data structure to facilitate high quality long-term observations of atmospheric particle number size distributions". Atmospheric Measurement Techniques. 5 (3): 657–685. Bibcode:2012AMT.....5..657W. doi:10.5194/amt-5-657-2012. hdl:10379/14424. 2012
- Preißler, J.; Martucci, G.; O’Dowd, C. D. (January 2019). Ground-based Remote-sensing Synergy for Cloud Properties and Aerosol-Cloud Interactions (Report Number 266) (PDF). Wexford, Ireland: Environmental Protection Agency, Government of Ireland.
