= Clare Watt =

British space scientist

Clare Watt is a British space scientist and is currently Professor of Space Physics at the Northumbria University. She was elected vice-president of the Royal Astronomical Society in 2022 and has served on the editorial board of Oxford University Press's RAS Techniques and Instruments journal since 2021. She has received numerous awards and honours related to her career and research including the Royal Astronomical Society thesis award.

== Background and scientific career ==
Watt studied for a BSc in Maths and Physics at the University of Aberdeen from 1994 to 1998. She then obtained a PhD in space plasma physics from St Catharine's College, Cambridge in 2002, working closely with the British Antarctic Survey. Moving to University of Alberta in Canada, she focussed on numerical modelling of auroral electrons. In 2013 she returned to the UK as a lecturer in Space Physics at the University of Reading, focussing on modelling of the Earth's radiation belts. Watt moved to Northumbria University in 2020, to take up the role of Professor of Space Physics.

== Research interests ==
Watt's primary research interest is kinetic plasma physics, particularly as applied to space environments. Her focus is on numerical modelling of wave-particle interactions which are central to the energisation or scattering of electrons in both the Earth's auroral regions and the radiation belts, which are a major space weather concern.

== Awards and honours ==
2022 Elected Vice-president of the Royal Astronomical Society

2021 co-chair of the Physical Sciences Working group that advises the Human and Robotic Exploration Directorate of the European Space Agency

2021 Member of the Science Programme Advisory Committee to the UK Space Agency

2021 editorial board for RAS Techniques and Instruments

2017 Elected councillor and trustee of the Royal Astronomical Society

2016 Selected to serve on the STFC Astronomy Grants Panel

2007 Nominated reporter for International Association of Geomagnetism and Aeronomy for Auroral Phenomenon

2005 European Geosciences Union "Young Talent in Geosciences" award

2003 Royal Astronomical Society thesis award
