= Christiaan Huygens Medal =

Prize awarded by the European Geosciences Union

The Christiaan Huygens Medal, named after the mathematician and natural philosopher Christiaan Huygens, is a prize awarded by the European Geosciences Union to promote excellence in geosciences and space science.

== List of prizewinners ==
- 2026 Vijay Prasad Dimri
- 2025 Francesco Soldovieri
- 2024 Nemesio M. Pérez
- 2023 Maurizio Fedi
- 2021 R. Giles Harrison
- 2020 Raffaele Persico
- 2019 Lev V. Eppelbaum
- 2018 Jothiram Vivekanandan
- 2017 Riccardo Lanari
- 2016 Karl U. Schreiber
- 2015 Kristine M. Larson
- 2011 Martin Hürlimann
- 2010 Jean-Loup Bertaux
- 2009 Valery Korepanov
- 2008 Horst Uwe Keller
