= Keith Runcorn Prize =

The Keith Runcorn Prize is awarded annually by the Royal Astronomical Society for the best British doctoral thesis in geophysics (including planetary science). The winner receives a cash prize and presents the results of their thesis at a meeting of the Royal Astronomical Society.

The prize is sponsored by Oxford University Press, and since 2007 named after Keith Runcorn, a British physicist whose paleomagnetic reconstruction of the relative motions of Europe and America revived the theory of continental drift.

== Recipients ==
Year	Name	Affiliation
1992	Douglas Stewart	University of Leeds
1993	Sara Russell	Open University
1994	Tim Henstock	University of Cambridge
1995	Graeme Sarson	University of Leeds
1996	Tim Horbury	Imperial College London
1997	Cathryn Mitchell	University of Wales at Aberystwyth
1998	Mark Muller	University of Cambridge
1999	Marcus Brüggen	University of Cambridge
2000	Dave Skeet	University of Oxford
2001	-	-
2002	Emma Bunce	University of Leicester
2003	Clare Watt	British Antarctic Survey
2004	Paul Williams	University of Oxford
2005	Phillip Livermore	University of Leeds
2006	Sophie Bassett	University of Durham
2007	Leigh Fletcher	University of Oxford
2008	David Jess	Queen's University Belfast
2009	David Halliday	University of Edinburgh
2010	James Verdon	University of Bristol
2011	David Kipping	University College London
2012	Sudipta Sarkar	University of Southampton
2013	Richard Walters	University of Leeds
2014	Hannah Christensen (née Arnold)	University of Oxford
2015	Matteo Ravasi	University of Edinburgh
2016	Rishy Mistry	Imperial College

== See also ==
- List of geophysics awards
- List of prizes named after people
