= Brewer–Dobson circulation =

Atmospheric circulation pattern

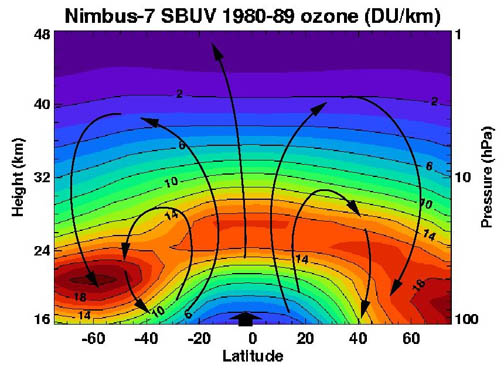

Brewer–Dobson circulation refers to the global atmospheric circulation pattern of tropical tropospheric air rising into the stratosphere and then moving poleward as it descends. The basics of the circulation were first proposed by Gordon Dobson and Alan Brewer. The term "Brewer–Dobson circulation" was first introduced in 1963. This circulation pattern explains observations of ozone and water vapor distribution, and has been accelerating in recent decades, likely due to climate change.

== Circulation ==
Brewer–Dobson circulation is driven by planetary scale atmospheric waves, namely Rossby waves, with results in westward drag and therefore poleward pumping action to conserve angular momentum.

== Global impacts ==
Because it moves air into and out of the stratosphere, Brewer–Dobson circulation determines the mean age and residence time of stratospheric gases, as well as tropical tropopause temperatures and stratospheric water vapor. Brewer–Dobson circulation directly impacts the distribution and abundance of stratospheric ozone by moving it from the tropics towards the poles. This transport helps to explain why tropical air has less ozone than polar air, even though the tropical stratosphere is where most atmospheric ozone is produced. Brewer–Dobson circulation also influences the lifetime of ozone-degrading substances and some greenhouse gases.

== Acceleration due to greenhouse effect ==
Interest in Brewer–Dobson circulation has increased in the 21st century due to predictions of general circulation models and chemistry-climate models that the circulation will accelerate due to greenhouse-gas induced climate change. Observations have recently confirmed that Brewer–Dobson circulation has accelerated at ~2.0% per decade for the past four decades, leading to a cooling of the tropical lower stratosphere and warming in high latitudes.

== See also ==
- Chapman cycle
- Dobson unit
