= Institute of Physics Edward Appleton Medal and Prize =

Award made for distinguished research in environmental physics

Institute of Physics Edward Appleton Medal & Prize
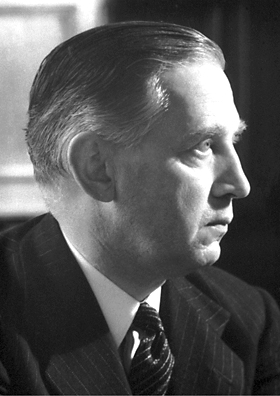
- The award is named in honour of Edward Appleton (1892–1965)
- Awarded for: Distinguished contributions to environmental, earth or atmospheric physics.
- Sponsored by: Institute of Physics
- Country: United Kingdom
- Presented by: Institute of Physics
- Formerly called: Chree Medal and Prize
- Rewards: Silver medal, £1000
- First award: 1941
- Website: www.iop.org/about/awards/subject/appleton/page_72412.html

The Edward Appleton Medal and Prize is awarded by the Institute of Physics for distinguished research in environmental, earth or atmospheric physics. Originally named after Charles Chree, the British physicist and former President of the Physical Society of London, it was renamed in 2008 to commemorate Edward Victor Appleton, winner of the Nobel Prize for proving the existence of the ionosphere.

== History ==
The prize was established in 1941 by Chree's sister, Jessie, after his death, and it was originally awarded biennially. It was first awarded to Sydney Chapman. From 2001 it was awarded annually. After the 2008 renaming the prize was awarded in even-dated years until 2016, then as and when required.

The cash prize part of the award has risen in value since its inception, reported at £150 in 1985 and £300 in 1987, to its present-day value of £1000.

== Winners ==
=== Recipients of the Appleton medal and prize ===
- 2026 Paul Brewer
- 2024 Nicolas Bellouin
- 2021 Philip Stier
- 2020 Adam Scaife
- 2019 Cathryn Mitchell
- 2016 Giles Harrison
- 2014 David Marshall
- 2012 Colin O'Dowd
- 2010 Myles Allen
- 2008 Ann Wintle

=== Recipients of the Chree medal and prize ===
- 2007 Michele Dougherty
- 2006 David Gubbins
- 2005 Barbara Maher
- 2004 Joanna Dorothy Haigh
- 2003 Michael Lockwood
- 2002 Peter Thomas Woods
- 2001 Joseph Charles Farman, Brian Gerard Gardiner and Jonathan David Shanklin
- 1999 John Edward Harries and Ronald Woodman
- 1997 John Michael David Coey
- 1995 Tudor Bowden Jones
- 1993 Alan Hugh Cook
- 1991 Lance Thomas
- 1989 John Nye
- 1987 Brian John Hoskins
- 1985 Adrian Edmund Gill
- 1983 William John Granville Beynon
- 1981 Keith Anthony Browning
- 1979 John Theodore Houghton
- 1977 Drummond Hoyle Matthews and Frederick John Vine
- 1975 Raymond Hide
- 1973 David Robert Bates
- 1971 Desmond George King-Hele
- 1969 Stanley Keith Runcorn
- 1967 John Herbert Chapman
- 1965 Basil John Mason
- 1963 Maurice Neville Hill
- 1961 Scott Ellsworth Forbush
- 1959 Reginald Cockcroft Sutcliffe
- 1957 Edward C Bullard
- 1955 David Forbes Martyn
- 1953 Julius Bartels
- 1951 George C Simpson
- 1949 Gordon Miller Bourne Dobson
- 1947 Edward V Appleton
- 1945 John Adam Fleming
- 1943 Basil Ferdinand Jamieson Schonland
- 1941 Sydney Chapman

== See also ==
- Institute of Physics Awards
- List of physics awards
- List of awards named after people
