= Cathryn Mitchell =

Professor of Electronic & Electronic Engineering

- Education: University of Wales, Aberystwyth
- Awards: Keith Runcorn Prize (1997); IOP Edward Appleton Medal and Prize (2019)
- Scientific career
- Workplaces: University of Bath
- Thesis: Tomographic image of ionospheric electron density (1996)

Cathryn N. Mitchell is a Professor of Electronic & Electronic Engineering at the University of Bath. She was awarded the 2019 Institute of Physics Edward Appleton Medal and Prize.

== Early life and education ==
Mitchell studied physics at the University of Wales, Aberystwyth. She remained there for her doctoral studies, where she explored the use of radio tomography to study the Earth's ionosphere. She was awarded the Royal Astronomical Society Keith Runcorn Prize (then Blackwell Prize) and University of Wales Granville Beynon prize for her dissertation.

== Research and career ==
Mitchell was awarded an Engineering and Physical Sciences Research Council (EPSRC) Challenging Engineering fellowship to develop algorithms for four-dimensional tomography, known MIDAS, Multi-Instrument Data Analysis Systems. She joined the University of Bath in 1999. She has used her computational algorithms in medical physics, working with the Christie Hospital and Royal United Hospital Bath to image for human movement, particularly in Alzheimer's disease. She led a fieldwork mission with the British Antarctic Survey to Antarctica, where she set up equipment at Rothera, Halley and in the Shackleton Mountains. She held a Royal Society Wolfson Research Merit Award from 2009 to 2014.

She is a Professor of Radio Science at the University of Bath, where she served as Academic Director of the University of Bath Doctoral College from 2017-2022. Mitchell developed a new Earth observation technique that uses ground-based and satellite data to image the ionosphere, providing information on how space weather may impact Global Positioning Systems (GPS). The technique has provided the first view of the ionosphere in response to space weather. Mitchell's research allows us to understand the origins of space weather as well as identifying how to better forecast. A solar storm in North America, one example of space weather, could result in a $2.6 trillion hit to the economy. She showed that magnetospheric electric fields cause large plasma enhancements and uplifts. The Government of the United Kingdom have invested several million to develop the ionosphere algorithms in MIDAS for space weather forecasts. Her algorithms have also contributed to GPS simulations developed by Spirent.

In 2015 she was asked by the Defence Science and Technology Laboratory to act as a UK government special adviser for the Emergencies sub group to examine infrastructure resilience to solar storms.

Mitchell held a Natural Environment Research Council (NERC) Fellowship. She is also involved with amateur radio and has written for The Conversation.

She currently holds a Royal Society Industry Fellowship.

=== Awards and honours ===
Her awards and honours include;

- 2020 Chapman Medal of the Royal Astronomical Society
- 2019 Institute of Physics Edward Appleton Medal and Prize
- 2006 Challenging Engineering Award
- 2003 Engineering and Physical Sciences Research Council Research Fellow
- 1997 Keith Runcorn Prize
- 1997 Royal Astronomical Society Blackwell Prize

=== Selected publications ===
- Mitchell, Cathryn (August 2003). "A three-dimensional time-dependent algorithm for ionospheric imaging using GPS". Annals of Geophysics. 46: 687.
- Mitchell, Cathryn (February 2003). "History, current state, and future directions of ionospheric imaging". Reviews of Geophysics. 46. doi:10.1029/2006RG000212.
- Mitchell, Cathryn (June 2005). "GPS TEC and scintillation measurements from the polar ionosphere during the October 2003 storm". Geophysical Research Letters. 32 (12): n/a. Bibcode:2005GeoRL..3212S03M. doi:10.1029/2004GL021644.
