= Sara Russell =

Professor of planetary sciences

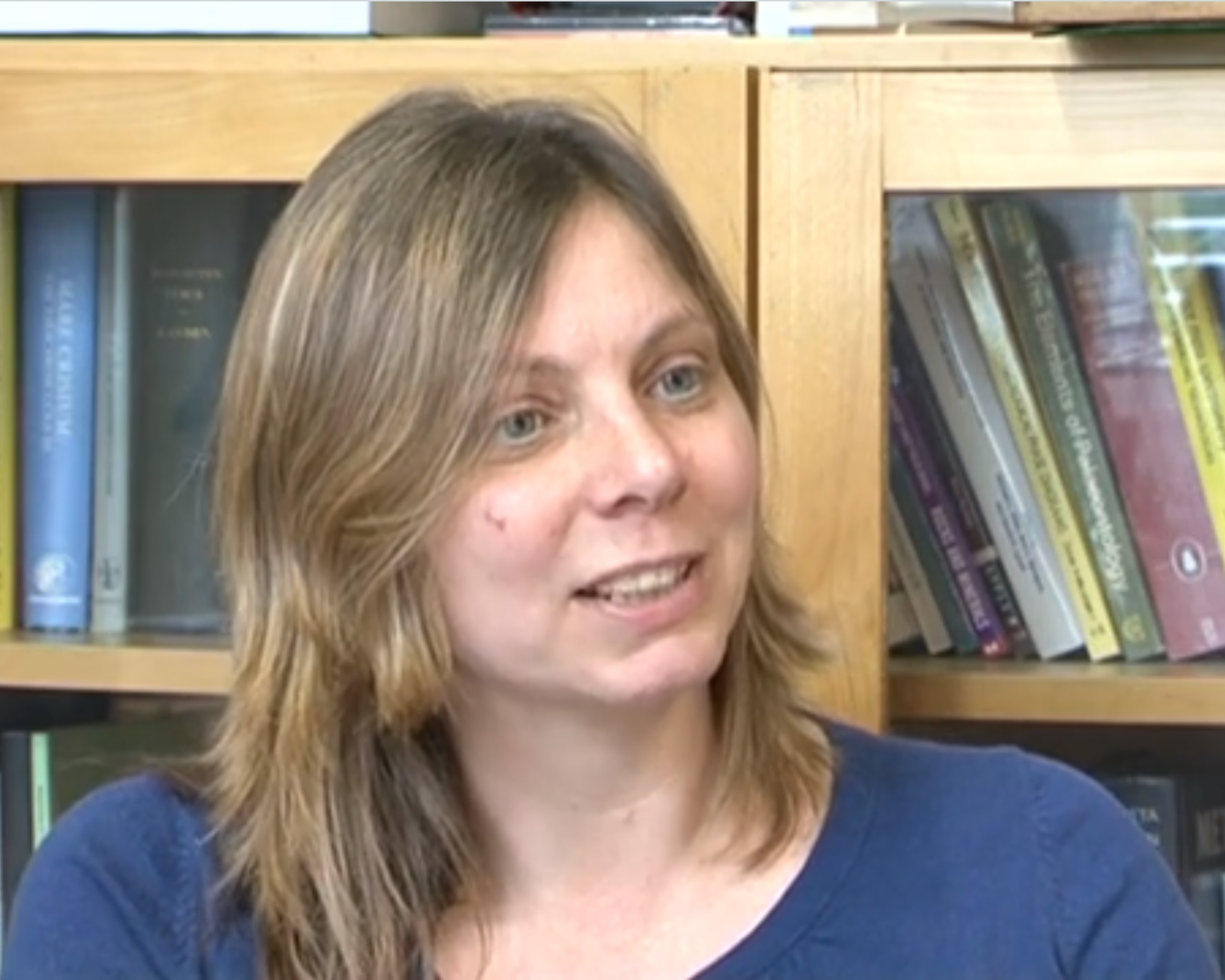
- Russell speaks on The Moon Landings & Cosmic Mineralogy in 2012
- Born: 1966 (age 59–60)
- Education: University of Cambridge; Open University
- Scientific career
- Workplaces: Natural History Museum; Smithsonian Institution; California Institute of Technology

Sara Samantha Russell (born 1966) is a professor of planetary sciences and leader of the Planetary Materials Group at the Natural History Museum, London. She is a Fellow of the Meteoritical Society and of the Royal Astronomical Society.

== Early life and education ==
Russell was educated at Altrincham Grammar School for Girls and was captivated by the Moon landing as a child. She studied at the University of Cambridge, where she was introduced to microanalysis by Jim Long. She had started studying natural sciences, but heard that geologists host the best parties, so switched courses. She was inspired to complete a PhD degree in geology after attending a lecture by Colin Pillinger, and moved to the Open University. She won the Royal Astronomical Society Keith Runcorn Prize for the best British doctoral thesis in geophysics in 1993.

== Career ==
Russell completed postdoctoral research at the California Institute of Technology and Smithsonian Institution. She joined the Natural History Museum in 1998, where she studied protostars and planets. In 2000 she edited the collection Protostars and Planets IV. Russell is leader of the micrometeorite and meteorite collection at the Natural History Museum, London. She has been on three expeditions to Antarctica searching for meteorites. She has been awarded the Antarctica Service Medal. She was awarded a Leverhulme Trust grant in 2005. In 2006 she studied the meteorites in the early solar system and the protoplanetary disc.

On behalf of the Natural History Museum, Russell was part of the team which arranged the acquisition of the Ivuna meteorite in 2008. In 2009 she published the book Meteorite with Caroline Smith and Gretchen Benedix. She won the Geological Society of London Bigsby Medal in 2010. In 2011 Russell took part in an exhibition at the Royal Observatory, Greenwich. She is a science team member of OSIRIS-REx. She was the initial point of contact in the process by which the Tissint meteorite came to be acquired by the Natural History Museum in 2012. In 2014 she studied Moon rocks brought back by the Apollo Astronauts, finding that the lunar crust did not form from a common source.

Russell has studied the origin of water in the inner Solar System with Monica Grady. She published Chondrules in 2018, a book which considers the silicate grains that form in the protoplanetary disk. The eponymous asteroid 5497 Sararussell was named after her. Russell is an advocate for diversity in science.
