= Giles Harrison =

Professor of Atmospheric Physics

Giles Harrison is a professor of Atmospheric Physics in the Department of Meteorology at the University of Reading, where he has served as head of department several times. He is a visiting professor at the Universities of Bath and Oxford. His research work continues over 250 years of UK studies in atmospheric electricity, in its modern form an interdisciplinary topic at the intersection of aerosol and cloud physics, solar-climate and internal-climate interactions, scientific sensor development and the retrieval of quantitative data from historical sources.

== Education ==
He was educated at Marling School Stroud, and St Catharine's College, Cambridge. He was the first person in his family to attend university. He holds doctorates from Imperial College London (PhD 1992), and the University of Cambridge (ScD 2014).

== Research activity ==
A major part of Harrison's work has focused on the charging of atmospheric particles and droplets and the effect of charge on their behaviour, for which he has pioneered new instruments and methods. This has included applying early atmospheric electrical data for reconstruction of past air pollution and in investigating the electrical effect of solar changes on the Earth's and other atmospheres. His experimental work has clearly demonstrated the widespread presence of atmospheric charge in regions well away from thunderstorms, particularly at horizontal edges of layer clouds. Motivated by the need to increase in situ atmospheric measurements of these phenomena using sensitive balloon-carried instrumentation, Harrison and his co-workers have provided some unique atmospheric measurements. These include turbulence data able to be applied beyond Earth to Titan's atmosphere, the first published airborne measurements of the Icelandic volcanic ash from Eyjafjallajökull, which were undertaken in UK airspace at government request during the April 2010 flight ban, direct evidence for unexpected enhancement of ionisation in the lower atmosphere during a solar storm, and observations of charge made opportunistically within a dust layer transported to the UK by the remnants of Hurricane Ophelia. Analysis, with co-workers, of historical weather and atmospheric electricity data from Shetland during the 1960s nuclear weapons tests, has associated this additional ionisation with increased rainfall.

== Other work ==
Beyond atmospheric electricity and atmospheric measurements, Harrison conceived and led the National Eclipse Weather Experiment. This Citizen Science project associated with the 2015 solar eclipse involved up to 3500 pupils and teachers nationally, promoted through the BBC's Stargazing Live. He subsequently edited a themed journal issue, bringing together new findings in "eclipse meteorology". He also contributed to the successful campaign of the Cloud Appreciation Society to persuade the World Meteorological Organization to classify the first new cloud since 1951, asperitas, through convening an international team which suggested a mechanism for its formation.

== Publications ==
He has authored or co-authored about 300 papers, co-edited Planetary Atmospheric Electricity and his successful postgraduate textbook on meteorological measurements is now available in Chinese.

== Recognition ==
Harrison was elected to the Academia Europaea in 2014. He is a senior fellow of the Higher Education Academy and a Fellow of the Institute of Physics. In 2011 he was the Bill Bright lecturer at the International Electrostatics Conference. In 2016 he was awarded the Edward Appleton Medal and Prize by the Institute of Physics, and he is the winner of the 2021 Christiaan Huygens Medal awarded by the European Geosciences Union. He chairs the Royal Meteorological Society's Special Interest Group on atmospheric electricity .
