= Jon Shanklin =

British scientist

Jonathan David Shanklin
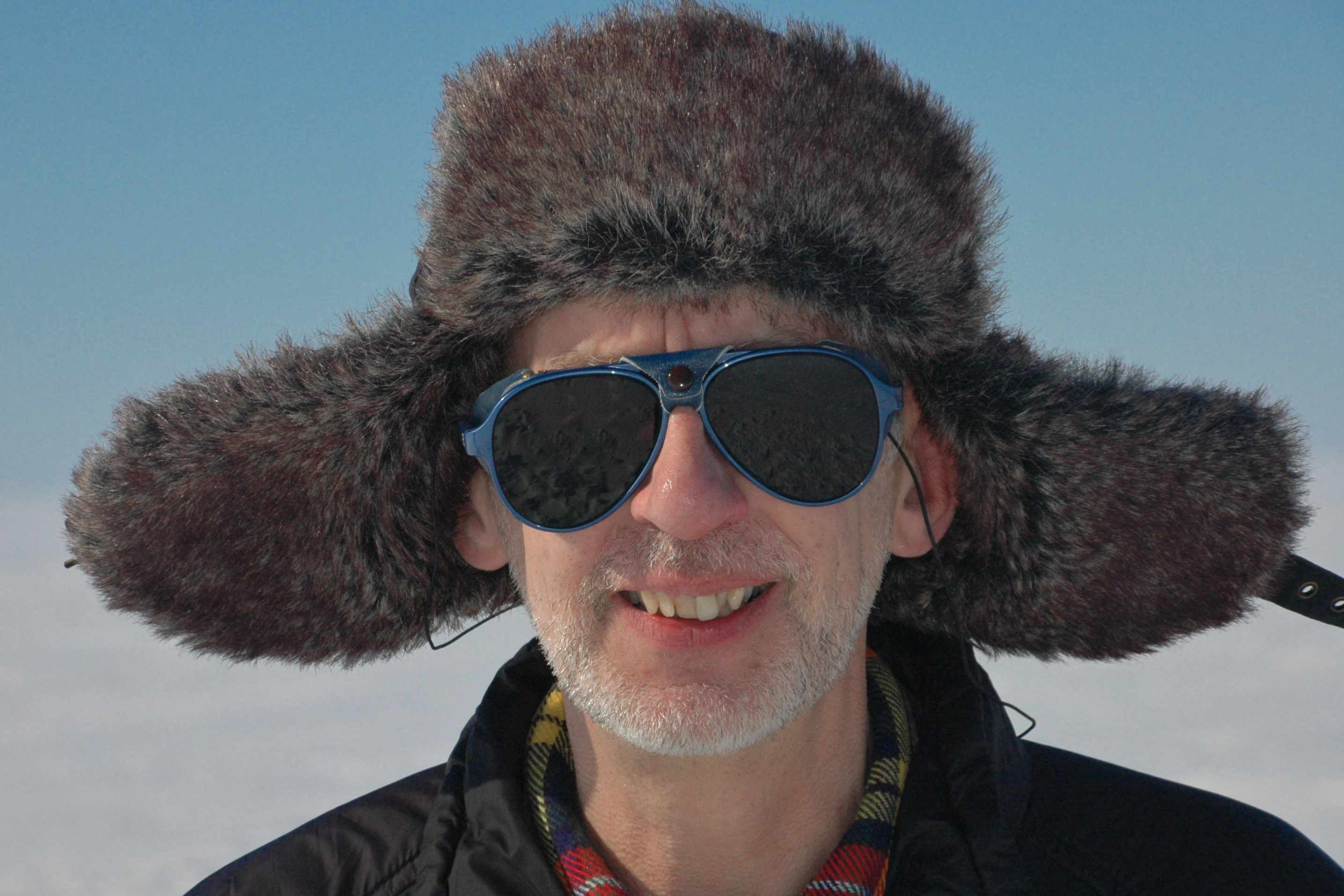
- Jonathan Shanklin in Antarctica, summer 2012
- Born: 29 September 1953 (age 73); Wrexham, North Wales, United Kingdom
- Known for: Ozone Hole Discovery
- Awards: The Chree Medal and Prize (2001)
- Scientific career
- Fields: Physics, Meteorology (Professional); Botany, Hepatics, Astronomy (Amateur)
- Workplaces: British Antarctic Survey
- Website: www.bas.ac.uk/profile/jdsh

Jonathan Shanklin (born 29 September 1953) is a meteorologist who has worked at the British Antarctic Survey since 1977. Together with Joe Farman and Brian G. Gardiner, he discovered the "Ozone Hole" in the 1980s.

Shanklin has described his role at the BAS as being that of a "general dogsbody" at the time of the discovery of the "ozone hole". He calibrated an instrument called the Dobson Ozone Spectrophotometer, which provided data on atmospheric ozone.

In an article discussing the discovery, the BBC quotes him as saying

Perhaps the most startling lesson from the ozone hole is just how quickly our planet can change. Given the speed with which humankind can affect it, following the precautionary principle is likely to be the safest road to future prosperity.

Shanklin maintains the ozone pages at BAS. He plays cricket, is a bell-ringer, an active local naturalist and is a keen amateur astronomer, being Director of the British Astronomical Association's Comet Section .

In December 2020, it was announced that the UK Antarctic Place-names Committee had named a glacier on the Antarctic Peninsula after Shanklin, in part to mark the 200th anniversary of the discovery of the continent.
