= David Marshall (oceanographer) =

British oceanographer (born 1968)

David Marshall FInstP
- Born: 13 July 1968 (age 58); London
- Education: Imperial College London
- Occupation: Physical oceanographer
- Awards: Edward Appleton Medal and Prize (2014)
- Website: http://www.marshallocean.net/

David Marshall FInstP (born 13 July 1968) is Professor of Physical Oceanography at the University of Oxford and a Fellow of St Hugh's College, Oxford.

== Career ==
He was head of the sub-department of Atmospheric, Oceanic and Planetary Physics from 2014 to 2018. From 2008 to 2012 he was co-director of the 21st Century Ocean Institute within the Oxford Martin School. He was awarded the 2014 Appleton Medal and Prize by the Institute of Physics for "fundamental contributions to understanding the fluid dynamics of the global ocean circulation", and was elected a Fellow of the Institute of Physics the same year.

Marshall studied at Imperial College London and then spent three years as a post-doctoral researcher at the Massachusetts Institute of Technology. He returned to the UK to establish the Physical Oceanography Group at the University of Reading, before moving to the University of Oxford in 2007. In 2014 he won the Institute of Physics Edward Appleton Medal and Prize. In 2017 he was elected a member of Academia Europaea.
