= Dobson ozone spectrophotometer =

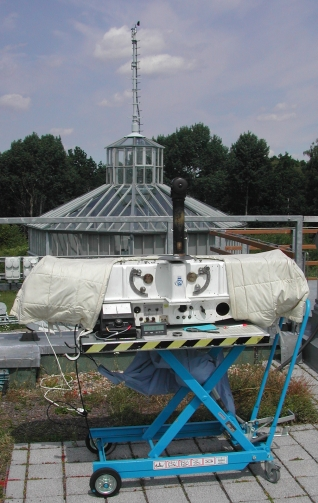
- Dobson D071 Spectrophotometer at the Lindenberg Meteorological Observatory.
- Component type: Ultraviolet spectrophotometer
- Inventor: Gordon Dobson
- First produced: 1924

The Dobson spectrophotometer, also known as Dobsonmeter, Dobson spectrometer, or just Dobson is one of the earliest instruments used to measure atmospheric ozone.

== History ==
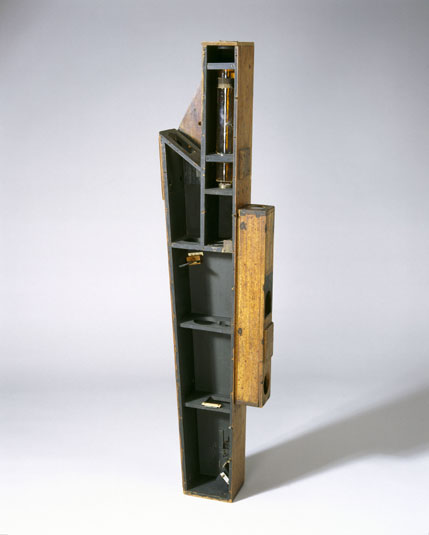
A Fery Spectrometer, using photographic plates, was the predecessor of the Dobson Spectrophotometer

The Dobson spectrometer was invented in 1924 by British physicist and meteorologist Gordon Dobson. A history of the development of the instrument is here and an example of one of Dobson's own instruments remains on display in the University of Oxford Department of Physics.

== Operation ==
Dobson spectrophotometers can be used to measure both total column ozone and profiles of ozone in the atmosphere. Ozone is tri-atomic oxygen, O_{3}; ozone molecules absorb harmful UV light in the atmosphere before it reaches the surface of the earth. No UVC radiation penetrates to the ground as it is absorbed in the ozone-oxygen cycle. However some longer-wave and less harmful UVB and most of the UVA are not absorbed as ozone is less opaque to these frequencies, so they penetrate to the ground level of Earth in higher quantities. The sources of light used may vary. Beside the direct sun light, the light from the clear sky, moon or stars may be used.

The Dobson spectrometer measures the total ozone by measuring the relative intensity of the UVB radiation that reaches the Earth and comparing it to that of UVA radiation at ground level. If all of the ozone were removed from the atmosphere, the amount of UVB radiation would equal the amount of UVA radiation on the ground. As ozone does exist in the atmosphere, the Dobson Spectrometer can use the ratio between UVA and UVB radiation on the ground to determine how much ozone is present in the upper atmosphere to absorb the UVC radiation.

The ratio is determined by turning the R-dial, which can be rotated a full 300°, on the instrument. The spectrometer compares two different wavelength intensities, UVB (305 nm) and UVA (325 nm), in order to calculate the amount of ozone. When turned, the R-dial filters and blocks out the light of the UVA wavelength until the intensity of the two wavelengths of light are equal. The ratio of the two wavelengths at incidence can be calculated once the filtered intensities are the same. The results are measured in Dobson Units, equal to 10 μm thickness of ozone compressed to Standard conditions for temperature and pressure (STP) in the column. If all of the ozone in the atmospheric column one was measuring were compressed to STP, the thickness of the compressed atmosphere in mm would equal an answer in Dobson Units divided by 100.

The vertical distribution of ozone is derived using the Umkehr method. This method relies on the intensities of reflected, rather than direct, UV light. Ozone distribution is derived from the change in the ratio of the same UV-pair frequencies with time as the sun sets. An "Umkehr" measurement takes about three hours, and provides data up to an altitude of 48 km, with the most accurate information for altitudes above 30 km.

The Dobson method has its drawbacks. It is strongly affected by aerosols and pollutants in the atmosphere, because they also absorb some of the light at the same wavelength. Measurements are made over a small area in the direction of the sun. Today this method is often used to calibrate data obtained by other methods, including satellites.

== Instruments and manufacturers ==
Some modernized versions of Dobson spectrophotometer exist and continue to provide data.

About 120 Dobsonmeters have been made, mostly by R&J Beck of London, of which about 50 remain in use today. The most famous ones are probably Nos. 31 and 51 with which Joe Farman of the British Antarctic Survey discovered the Ozone Hole above the South Pole in 1984. The "World Standard Dobson", No. 83, is owned and operated by the US Dept of Commerce's, NOAA, as is the secondary standard, No. 65.

The oldest instrument still in use is No.8 located at the roof of the Norwegian Polar Institute at Ny-Ålesund, Svalbard. This instrument has the last reported data for 1997.

The instrument D003, operated in Kunming, China reported data to August 2009. The history of the stations and instruments can be found at the World Ozone and UV Data Centre.

The Environment Canada (Alan West Brewer) developed double- and single- monochromator spectrophotometers known as the "Brewer" Spectrophotometer produced by Kipp & Zonen.
