= Umkehr effect =

Example of Umkehr curve from a Dobson ozone spectrophotometer

In solid state physics, the Umkehr (meaning 'reversal', German pronunciation: [ˈʊmˌkeːʁ], from German um 'around' and kehr 'turn') is the time variation of the ratio of the scattered intensity at two different wavelengths. The Umkehr effect is observed when measurements are made with ultraviolet spectrophotometer of the ratio of the zenith sky light intensities of two wavelengths in the solar ultraviolet when the sun is near the horizon. The shorter of two wavelengths (intensity I) is strongly absorbed and the other (intensity I' ) is weakly absorbed. If the value of log(I/I' ) is plotted against the sun's zenith angle, it is observed that this log-intensity ratio decreases as the zenith angle increases until a minimum is reached for a zenith angle of about 8° (when the wavelengths are 3114 and 3324 A).

This effect was first noticed by F. W. P. Götz in 1930. The Umkehr measurement is known as customarily N-value and is given by the logarithm base 10 of the ratio of cloudless zenith sky intensities at two different wavelengths scaled by a multiplicative factor 100 plus a constant which depends on instruments and extraterrestrial radiation. Methods for deriving vertical distribution from the umkehr measurements were developed by Götz, G. M. B. Dobson and A. R. Meetham in 1934, using the Dobson ozone spectrophotometer developed by Dobson. In 1964, Carlton Mateer provided analysis on information content in umkehr measurements.

$$N(\theta) = -100 \log_{10} \frac{I(\lambda',\theta)}{I(\lambda,\theta)} + K$$.

Considering light which is scattered only once in the atmosphere, the light received by the instrument at surface is contributed by light scattered downward from all the levels in the atmosphere. The amount of light contributed by scattering at any particular level depends on (a) the number of air molecules at that level and (b) the absorption by ozone and scattering by air molecules both before and after scattering. As the height increases contribution of effect (a) decreases and contribution of effect (b) increases. For a given zenith angle, the scattered light contribution comes from a well defined layer of atmosphere, which can be termed as an effective scattering height. The effective scattering height depends on the ozone absorption coefficient and on the solar zenith angle, increasing as with each of these. The effective scattering height will always be higher for shorter wavelengths which are more strongly absorbed. As the sun approaches the horizon, the two intensities decrease, but intensity I decreases more rapidly than I' . However, when the effective scattering height for the short wavelength is above the ozone maximum, I decreases more slowly than I' , because the ozone absorption occurs mostly in the shorter vertical path after the scattering event, and the ratio I/I' increases until the effective scattering height for I' is also above the ozone maximum. This reversal (Umkehr) or inversion implies the existence of maximum of ozone concentration at some level in the atmosphere.

The resulting ozone profile derived from reduction of these measurements is quite dependent on the algorithm used. The most current algorithm is I. Petropavlovskikh and P.K. Bhartia (2004).
