= G. M. B. Dobson =

British physicist (1889–1976)

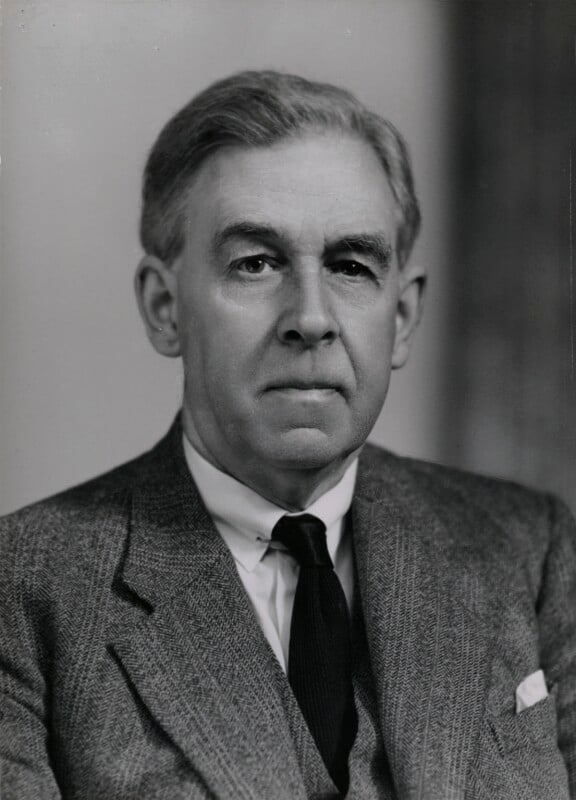
- Dobson in 1952
- Born: George Miller Bourne Dobson; 25 February 1889; Knott End, Windermere
- Died: 10 March 1976 (aged 87)
- Education: University of Cambridge
- Known for: Brewer–Dobson circulation Dobson unit Dobson spectrometer
- Spouses: Winifred Duncombe Rimer (married 1914-52); Olive Mary Bacon (married 1954-76)
- Children: 3
- Awards: FRS (1927); Symons Gold Medal (1939); Rumford Medal (1942); Royal Society Bakerian Medal (1945); Chree medal and prize (1949); CBE (1951)
- Scientific career
- Fields: Atmospheric physics
- Workplaces: University of Oxford

Gordon Miller Bourne Dobson CBE FRS (25 February 1889 – 10 March 1976) was a British physicist and meteorologist who did important work on ozone.

== Education ==
He was educated at Sedbergh School and Gonville and Caius College, Cambridge, graduating with a first in Natural Sciences in 1909. He was later awarded DSc (Oxon).

== Research and career ==
In 1913 he became an instructor in meteorology at the Central Flying School, and was at the Royal Aircraft Establishment, Farnborough, from 1916 to 1918. In 1921 he was appointed lecturer in meteorology at the University of Oxford, becoming reader in meteorology in 1927, a position he held until 1950, when he became university demonstrator in physics and climatology. He was a fellow of Merton College, Oxford, from 1937 to 1956.

By studying meteorites he noticed that the temperature profile of the tropopause was not constant, as had previously been believed (hence the name stratosphere). In fact there was, he showed, a region where the temperature sharply rose. This, he proposed, was happening because UV radiation was heating ozone in what has become known as the ozone layer.

He noted the connection between sunspots and weather, and measured the ultraviolet levels of our star. He built the first Dobson ozone spectrophotometers and studied the results over many years. The Dobson unit, a unit of measurement of vertically integrated atmospheric ozone density, is named after him. The Brewer-Dobson circulation is a semi-eponymous model of atmospheric currents that explains the distribution of ozone by latitude.

== Awards and honours ==
Dobson was elected a Fellow of the Royal Society (FRS) in 1927, awarded their Rumford Medal in 1942 and delivered their Bakerian lecture in 1945.

He won the Chree medal and prize in 1949.

He served as president of the Royal Meteorological Society from 1947 to 1949 and was awarded their prestigious Symons Gold Medal for 1938. He was made a CBE in 1951.

== See also ==
- Umkehr effect
