= Charles Chree =

British physicist

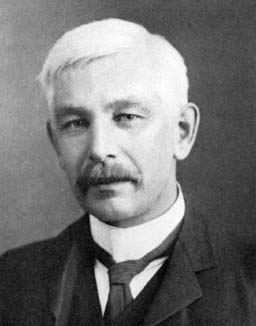
Charles Chree (circa 1900)

Charles Chree, FRS (5 May 1860 – 12 August 1928) was a British physicist, an authority on terrestrial magnetism and atmospheric electricity, and for 32 years Superintendent of Kew Observatory.

Chree was born in Lintrathen, Forfarshire, Scotland on 5 May 1860, second son to Rev Charles Chree. He was educated at the Grammar School, Old Aberdeen, the University of Aberdeen where he graduated MA in 1879 and the University of Cambridge where he graduated as Sixth Wrangler (MA, 1883).

Chree was elected a Fellow of the Royal Society in 1897, his candidacy citation listing his achievements as: "Author of the following memoirs, and of many others on analogous subjects - 1. Effects of pressure on the Magnetisation of Cobalt, Phil Trans: 1890 2. Conduction of heat in liquids, Proc: R. Soc: 1887. 3. Stresses and strains in isotropic, elastic, solid ellipsoids, etc, Proc: R. Soc: 1895. 4. A solution of the equations Equilibrium of elastic solids etc, etc, Camb: Phil: Trans: XV. 5. On some compound vibrating systems, Camb: Phil: Trans: XV. 6. Changes in dimensions of solids due to given systems of forces. Camb: Phil: Trans: XV. 7. The isotropic elastic sphere and spherical shell, Camb: Phil: Trans: XV. 8. Forced vibrations in isotropic, elastic, solid spheres, and spherical shells. Camb: Phil. Trans XVI. 9. Rotating, elastic, solid cylinders of elliptic section. Phil: Mag. 1892. 10. Contribution to the theory of the Robinson Cap auxmomoter. Phil: Mag: 1895. 11. Longitudinal vibrations of aeolotropic bars with one axis of material symmetry. Quar: Journ: Math: 1890. 12. Isotropic, elastic solids of nearly spherical form. Amer: Journ: Mathem: XVI".

Chree was awarded the James Watt medal by the Institution of Civil Engineers in 1905.

He was President of the Physical Society of London between 1908 and 1910.

Chree won the Royal Society Hughes Medal in 1919 "for his researches in terrestrial magnetism".

Chree served as president of the Royal Meteorological Society from 1922 to 1923.

He was appointed Superintendent of Kew Observatory in 1893, a post he retained until 1925, a remarkably long period of 32 years. During his tenure of office he was responsible for testing thousands of chronometers, watches, thermometers and other scientific instruments, success in which tests gained the award of a "Kew Certificate".

Chree received degrees of D.Sc. from Cambridge in 1895 and LL.D. from Aberdeen in 1898.

The Chree Medal and Prize of the Institute of Physics was named for him. The awards were renamed in 2008.

He died on Sunday 12 August 1928 in Worthing, Sussex. He was unmarried.
