= List of fellows of the Royal Society elected in 1927 =

This is a list of people elected Fellow of the Royal Society in 1927.

== Fellows ==
- Sir Edward Victor Appleton
- Thomas Graham Brown
- Richard Higgins Burne
- Sir James Chadwick
- Gordon Miller Bourne Dobson
- George Claridge Druce
- Sebastian Ziani de Ferranti
- James Pickering Kendall
- Sir Patrick Playfair Laidlaw
- Joseph William Mellor
- Otto Rosenheim
- Meghnad N Saha
- John Sebastian Bach Stopford, Baron Stopford of Fallowfield
- Herbert Henry Thomas
- Charles Morley Wenyon

== Statute 12 ==
- Stanley Baldwin, 1st Earl Baldwin of Bewdley
