= Riccardo Lanari =

Italian electrical engineer

Riccardo Lanari is an electrical engineer at Consiglio Nazionale delle Ricerche (CNR) in Naples, Italy. He was named a Fellow of the Institute of Electrical and Electronics Engineers (IEEE) in 2013 for his contributions to synthetic aperture radar processing.
