= Dobson unit =

Measurement of equivalent thickness of atmospheric trace gas

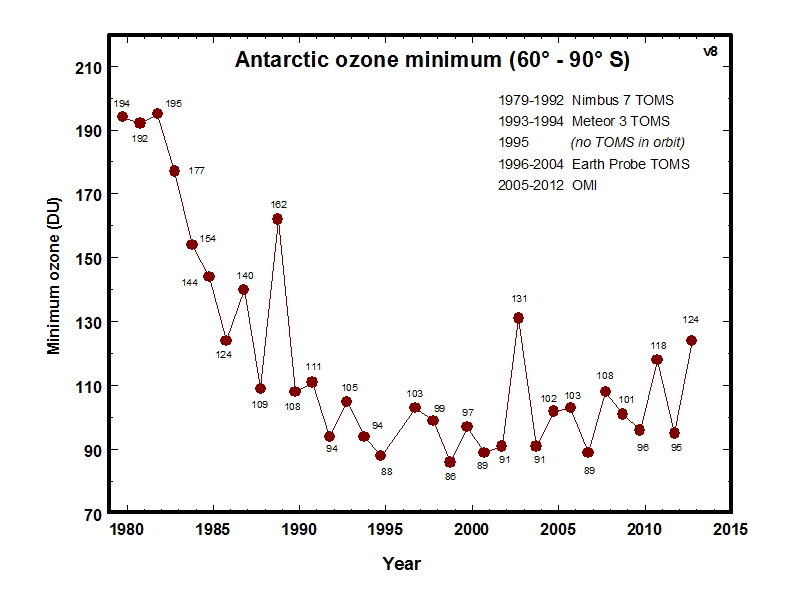
An Antarctic Ozone chart measured in Dobson Units

The Dobson unit (DU) is a unit of measurement of the amount of a trace gas in a vertical column through the Earth's atmosphere. It originated by, and continues to be primarily used in respect to, the study of atmospheric ozone, whose total column amount, usually termed "total ozone", and sometimes "column abundance", is dominated by the high concentrations of ozone in the stratospheric ozone layer.

The Dobson unit is defined as the thickness (in units of 10 μm) of that layer of pure gas which would be formed by the total column amount at standard conditions for temperature and pressure (STP). This is sometimes referred to as a 'milli-atmo-centimeter'. A typical column amount of 300 DU of atmospheric ozone therefore would form a 3 mm layer of pure gas at the surface of the Earth if its temperature and pressure conformed to STP.

The Dobson unit is named after Gordon Dobson, a researcher at the University of Oxford who in the 1920s built the first instrument to measure total ozone from the ground, making use of a double prism monochromator to measure the differential absorption of different bands of solar ultraviolet radiation by the ozone layer. This instrument, called the Dobson ozone spectrophotometer, has formed the backbone of the global network for monitoring atmospheric ozone and was the source of the discovery in 1984 of the Antarctic ozone hole.

== Ozone ==
NASA uses a baseline value of 220 DU for ozone. This was chosen as the starting point for observations of the Antarctic ozone hole, since values of less than 220 Dobson units were not found before 1979. Also, from direct measurements over Antarctica, a column ozone level of less than 220 Dobson units is a result of the ozone loss from chlorine and bromine compounds.

== Sulfur dioxide ==
In addition, Dobson units are often used to describe total column densities of sulfur dioxide, which occurs in the atmosphere in small amounts due to the combustion of fossil fuels, from biological processes releasing dimethyl sulfide, or by natural combustion such as forest fires. Large amounts of sulfur dioxide may be released into the atmosphere as well by volcanic eruptions. The Dobson unit is used to describe total column amounts of sulfur dioxide because it appeared in the early days of ozone remote sensing on ultraviolet satellite instruments (such as TOMS).

== Derivation ==
The Dobson unit arises from the ideal gas law

$$PV = nRT = Nk_BT$$

where P is pressure, V is volume, n is number of moles, R is the gas constant, T is temperature in kelvins, N is the number of molecules, and k_{B} is the Boltzmann constant.

The number density of air is the number of molecules or atoms per unit volume:

$$n_\text{air} = \frac{N}{V},$$

and when plugged into the real gas law, the number density of air is found by using pressure, temperature and the Boltzmann constant. At standard temperature and pressure (273.15 K and 101,325 Pa):

$$n_\text{air} = \frac{P}{k_BT} = \frac{101325~\text{Pa}}{(1.380649 \times 10^{-23}~\frac{\text{Pa}\,\text{m}^3}{\text{K}}) \cdot {273.15 ~\text{K}}} = 2.68678 \times 10^{25} ~\text{molecules}/\text{m}^{3}$$

A Dobson unit measures column density, the number of molecules in a vertical column of air per unit area extending from Earth’s surface to the top of the atmosphere. Specifically, a Dobson unit is 0.01 mm (10^{-5} m) of pure gas at standard temperature and pressure. To convert from molecules per cubic meter (a volume) to molecules per square meter (an area), this figure must be multiplied by 0.01 mm:

$$(2.68678 \times 10^{25} ~\text{molecules}/\text{m}^{3}) \cdot (10^{-5} ~\text{m}) = 2.68678 \times 10^{20} ~\text{molecules}/\text{m}^{2}$$

Thus, a Dobson unit is equal to 2.68678 × 10^{20} molecules or 0.44615 millimoles per square meter. Using ozone's molar mass of 47.9982 g/mol, this is equal to 0.02141 g/m^{2} of ozone. A normal ozone column density of 300 DU would convert to about 134 millimoles or 6.42 grams of ozone per square meter.
