= Alan West Brewer =

British scientist

- Born: 1915; Montreal (Canada)
- Died: 21 November 2007; Devon (United Kingdom)
- Education: University College London
- Occupation: Atmospheric physicist
- Employers: University of Oxford; University of Toronto
- Awards: Patterson Medal (1971)

Alan West Brewer (1915 – 21 November 2007) was a British-Canadian physicist and climatologist. Born in Montreal, Quebec, Canada and raised in Derby, England, he earned a scholarship to study physics at the University College London. He received his M.Sc. there, and began to work for the Met Office in 1937. During World War II, he researched contrails for the Royal Air Force, making the discovery that the stratosphere is much drier than had been presumed. Later this observation led to the development of Brewer-Dobson circulation. Brewer worked at the Subdepartment of Atmospheric, Oceanic and Planetary Physics, University of Oxford from 1948 until 1962, when he became a professor at University of Toronto. In 1977, Brewer retired from the University of Toronto, returning to England, in Devon, where he farmed until nearly 80 years old.

In late 1959, he and James Milford developed the Oxford-Kew ozone sonde. He also developed the Brewer ozone spectrophotometer with Dave Wardle which is currently the most accurate instrument for measuring ozone.

Brewer married Iris, another UCL physicist, in 1939. They had three children.
