= Adam Scaife =

British meteorologist (born 1970)

Adam A. Scaife is a British physicist and head of long range prediction at the Met Office. He is also a professor at Exeter University. Scaife carries out research into long range weather forecasting and computer modelling of the climate and has published over 300 peer reviewed studies on atmospheric dynamics, computer modelling and climate as well as popular science and academic books on meteorology.

== Career ==
Scaife was born in Yorkshire in the UK and studied Natural Sciences (Physics) at Cambridge University, Environmental Science at Surrey University and completed a PhD in Meteorology at Reading University (academic advisor Prof Ian N James). He joined the Met Office in 1992, and worked on climate dynamics while developing improved computer models of the atmosphere. He later also joined Exeter University as Professor of Applied Mathematics in 2017.

Many of his studies show how predictable factors affect weather from months to years ahead. He is based at the Met Office Hadley Centre for Climate Prediction and Research and the University of Exeter, working on climate modeling and long range weather prediction. He leads research and production of monthly, seasonal and decadal predictions at the Met Office. Scaife and his team have made recent advances in long range weather forecasting, demonstrating skilful prediction of the surface North Atlantic Oscillation and predicting the first year that global temperature would exceed 1.5 degrees. They also uncovered the paradox that for certain aspects of climate, current computer models are better at predicting the real world than they are at predicting themselves. Scaife's recent research demonstrates a link between year to year climate predictions and subtle changes in the rotation rate of the Earth and hence the length of day. This has also led to the discovery that El Nino and La Nina events affect mid latitude weather patterns a whole year later.

Scaife was co-chair of the World Meteorological Organisation's Working Group on Seasonal to Interannual Prediction and served as a member of the scientific steering group of the World Climate Research Programme's core project on the stratosphere and its role in climate. He is a fellow of the Institute of Physics and the Royal Meteorological Society and co-led the World Meteorological Organisation's grand challenge on Near Term Climate Prediction. Scaife is co-chair of the Royal Meteorological Society's special interest group on climate dynamics and is often involved in the public communication of meteorology and climate science

== Awards ==
- Meteorological Society of Japan 5th Distinguished Ogura Lecture (2025)
- Institute of Physics Edward Appleton Medal (2020)
- Royal Meteorological Society's Buchan Prize (2019)
- Copernicus Medal (2018)
- American Geophysical Union ASCENT Award (2016)
- Royal Meteorological Society's Adrian Gill Award (2014)
- L.G. Groves Memorial prize (2013)
- Lloyds Science of Risk Prize for Climate Science (2011)
