= Brian G. Gardiner (meteorologist) =

British meteorologist

Brian Gerard Gardiner (born 18 February 1945 in Glasgow) is a retired British meteorologist, formerly working for the British Antarctic Survey as head of the meteorological and ozone monitoring unit. Together with Joe Farman and Jonathan Shanklin, he discovered the "Ozone Hole". Their results were first published on 16 May 1985. They won the Institute of Physics Chree medal and prize in 2001.
