= Paulo Artaxo =

Brazilian atmospheric physicist

Paulo Eduardo Artaxo Netto
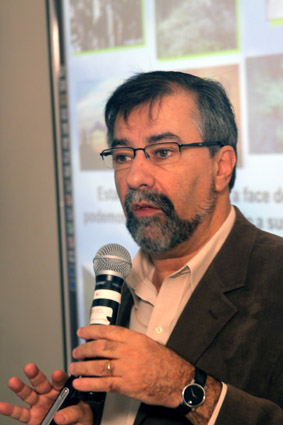
- Occupations: Scientist, Professor
- Employer: University of São Paulo
- Known for: Environmental research, Climate studies
- Notable work: Research on Amazon rain forest and climate change

Paulo Eduardo Artaxo Netto is a Brazilian atmospheric physicist.

== Early life and education ==
Born in São Paulo, Brazil, Artaxo pursued his undergraduate and graduate studies at the University of São Paulo, where he obtained both his MSc and PhD in Physics.

== Academic and professional career ==
Artaxo has held postdoctoral positions at several institutions, including the University of Antwerp in Belgium, Lund University in Sweden, and the NASA Goddard Space Flight Center in the United States.

At USP, Artaxo leads a research group that has revealed how aerosol particles, emitted by both natural processes and human activities, are critical to cloud formation and, consequently, to the regional and global climate. His research on the Amazon has highlighted the region's vulnerability to climate change, especially regarding the potential feedback loops that could exacerbate global warming.

== Awards and recognition ==
He was awarded the TWAS Prize in Earth Sciences in 2007 and has been recognized as one of the most influential researchers in his field by Clarivate Analytics multiple times.
