= Joe Farman =

British geophysicist (1930–2013)

Joseph Farman
- Born: 7 August 1930
- Died: 11 May 2013 (aged 82)
- Citizenship: British
- Education: Corpus Christi College, Cambridge
- Known for: Discovery of Antarctic Ozone hole
- Awards: CBE (2000); The Chree Medal and Prize (2001)
- Scientific career
- Workplaces: University of Cambridge; British Antarctic Survey; British Army

Joseph Charles Farman CBE (7 August 1930 – 11 May 2013) was a British geophysicist who worked for the British Antarctic Survey. Together with Brian Gardiner and Jon Shanklin, he published the discovery of the ozone hole over Antarctica, having used Dobson ozone spectrophotometers. Their results were first published in May 1985.

== Early life ==
Farman was born in Norwich. His father was a builder, and his mother was a primary school teacher, and he had a sister eight years older than himself.

== Education and career ==
He was educated at Norwich School, where he was a prefect in Coke House, and Corpus Christi College, Cambridge, where he gained an undergraduate degree in Natural Sciences. After graduation, Farman worked with De Havilland, an aircraft manufacturer. In 1956, he responded to an advert for a job for a physicist to work in Antarctica. He was appointed to this role, and joined the Falkland Islands Dependencies Survey, which later became the British Antarctic Survey. Farman worked for the British Antarctic Survey until 1990, when he retired.

Farman began work at the Halley research station on the Brunt Ice Shelf in Antarctica in 1957, where he deployed instruments for making atmospheric measurements including a Dobson meter, for measuring ozone. In early 1982, Farman noticed that the 25-year old instrument began to show dips in recorded ozone levels. In October 1982, the ozone values fell to remarkably low levels. Once Farman and colleagues were confident that the measurements were correct, they published their observations in the journal Nature; this was the first evidence for the presence of a seasonal ozone 'hole' over Antarctica, caused by chemical reactions of manmade halocarbons with stratospheric ozone during the Antarctic spring.

== Awards ==
He received numerous honours for his discovery of the Antarctic ozone hole, including the Society of Chemical Industry (SCI) Environment Medal, the Chree Medal and Prize, membership of the Global 500 Roll of Honour, and a CBE in the 2000 New Year Honours. For his critical contribution to saving the ozone layer, Farman was a winner of the 2021 Future of Life Award along with Stephen O. Andersen and Susan Solomon. Dr. Jim Hansen, former director of the NASA Goddard Institute for Space Studies and director of Columbia University's Program on Climate Science, Awareness and Solutions said, "In Farman, Solomon and Andersen we see the tremendous impact individuals can have not only on the course of human history, but on the course of our planet's history. My hope is that others like them will emerge in today's battle against climate change." Professor Brian Greene of Columbia University added, "the 2021 Future of Life award winners show how science can work for the betterment of humanity."

== Family ==
In 1971, Farman married Paula Bowyer. They moved to Cambridge in 1976.
