= Maria Cristina Facchini =

Italian geoscientist

Maria Cristina Facchini (born 1960) is an Italian geoscientist and a research director at the National Research Council. Her studies focus on the physics and chemistry of aerosols and clouds, and their effect on our atmosphere and climate. She has been awarded an order of merit by the Italian president, and co-authored a paper that won the 2014 Haagen-Smit Prize.

== Early life ==
Facchini was born in Lugo, in the province of Ravenna, Italy, in 1960. She graduated magna com laude in 1985 at the University of Bologna with a major in chemistry, and earned her PhD at the same university.

== Research and career ==
Facchini's researches the chemical and physical processes of aerosols in the atmosphere, both natural (clouds) and man-made, and how these processes affect phenomena including regional air quality, ultraviolet radiation levels, and climate. These impact, as her group's website puts it, "the fundamental necessities of human existence", such as human health, food production, and water resources.

Based at the University of Bologna since the 1980s, Facchini took from Riccado Valentini as the director of research at the Institute of Atmospheric Sciences and Climate (ISAC) of the Italian National Research Council in January 2023. She has published over 150 papers in peer-reviewed publications as of 2015. She is on multiple panels and boards, including the Scientific Advisory Board of the Max Planck Institute for Chemistry in Mainz, Germany since 2011, and the Council of European Geochemistry Society. She was a lead author of Chapter 1 of the Working Group I Fifth Assessment Report of the Intergovernmental Panel on Climate Change. Facchini is president of the Italian Society of Climate Sciences since 2023.

Facchini was a co-author on the paper that won the 2014 Haagen-Smit Prize, "in recognition of its excellent contribution to the studies of aerosol observations in different areas in Europe". She was also appointed a Commendatore of the Italian Republic.

== Honours, awards ==
Facchini has received several honours and awards during her career:

- 2014: "Highly Cited Researcher" by Thomson Reuters, placing Facchini within the 1% of the most cited geoscientists in the world
- 2014: Winner of the Haagen-Smit Prize, yearly awarded to a relevant publication in the field of atmospheric sciences
- 2017: Commander of the Order of Merit of the Italian Republic by decree of the President of the Italian Republic
