= British Antarctic Survey =

Polar research organisation

- Abbreviation: BAS
- Formation: 1962
- Legal status: Government organisation
- Headquarters: Cambridge, Cambridgeshire, England
- Region served: United Kingdom
- Director: Professor Dame Jane Francis
- Parent organisation: Natural Environment Research Council
- Budget: £48,053,000 (2011–12)
- Staff: 400+ staff
- Website: www.bas.ac.uk

The British Antarctic Survey (BAS) is the United Kingdom's national polar research institute. It has a dual purpose, to conduct polar science, enabling better understanding of global issues, and to provide an active presence in the Antarctic on behalf of the UK. It is part of the Natural Environment Research Council (NERC). With over 400 staff, BAS takes an active role in Antarctic affairs, operating five research stations, one ship and five aircraft in both polar regions, as well as addressing key global and regional issues. This involves joint research projects with over 40 UK universities and more than 120 national and international collaborations.

Having taken shape from activities during World War II, it was known as the Falkland Islands Dependencies Survey until 1962.

== History ==
Operation Tabarin was a small British expedition in 1943 to establish permanently occupied bases in the Antarctic. It was a joint undertaking by the Admiralty and the Colonial Office. At the end of the war it was renamed the Falkland Islands Dependencies Survey (FIDS) and full control passed to the Colonial Office. At this time there were four stations, three occupied and one unoccupied. By the time FIDS was renamed the British Antarctic Survey in 1962, 19 stations and three refuges had been established.

In 2012 the parent body, Natural Environment Research Council (NERC), proposed merging the BAS with another NERC institute, National Oceanography Centre in Southampton. This proved controversial, and after the House of Commons Science and Technology Committee opposed the move the plan was dropped. Since April 2018 NERC has been part of UK Research and Innovation.

=== Directors ===
In 1956, the FID Scientific Bureau and FIDS Rear Base were combined into a single FIDS London Office, with a Director for the first time responsible for the whole London operation.

Denotes service as acting director

Portrait	Director	Term start	Term end
	Raymond Priestley	1956	1958
	Vivian Fuchs	1958	1973
	Richard Laws	1973	1987
	David Drewry	1987	1994
	Barry Heywood	1994	1997
	Chris Rapley	1998	2007
	Nick Owens	2007	2012
	Alan Rodger	2012	2013
	Jane Francis	2013	Incumbent

== Research stations ==
=== Antarctica ===
BAS research stations in the British Antarctic Territory

The BAS operates five permanent research stations in the British Antarctic Territory:

- Rothera Research Station on Adelaide Island
- Halley Research Station on the Brunt Ice Shelf
- Signy Research Station on Signy Island
- Fossil Bluff logistics facility on Alexander Island
- Sky Blu logistics facility in Ellsworth Land

Of these Research Stations, only Rothera is staffed throughout the year. Before 2017 Halley was also open year-round.

Antarctic research stations
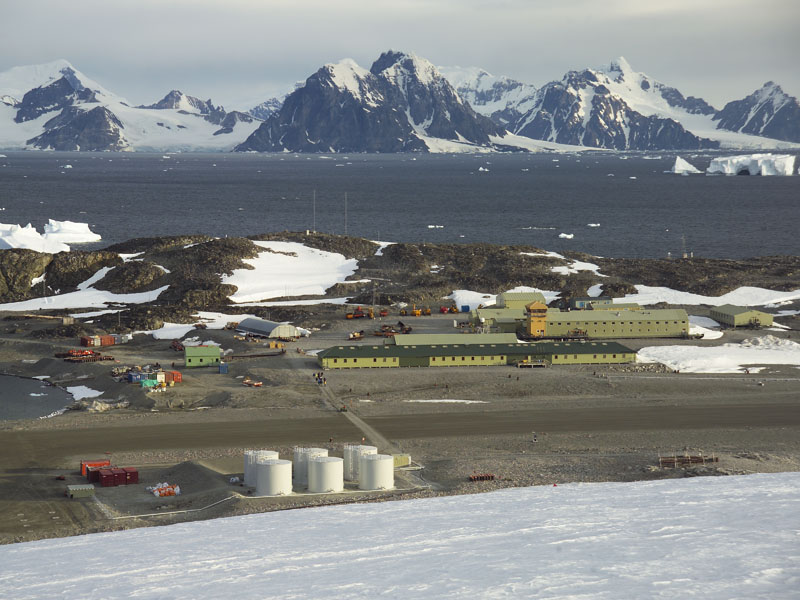
Rothera Research Station

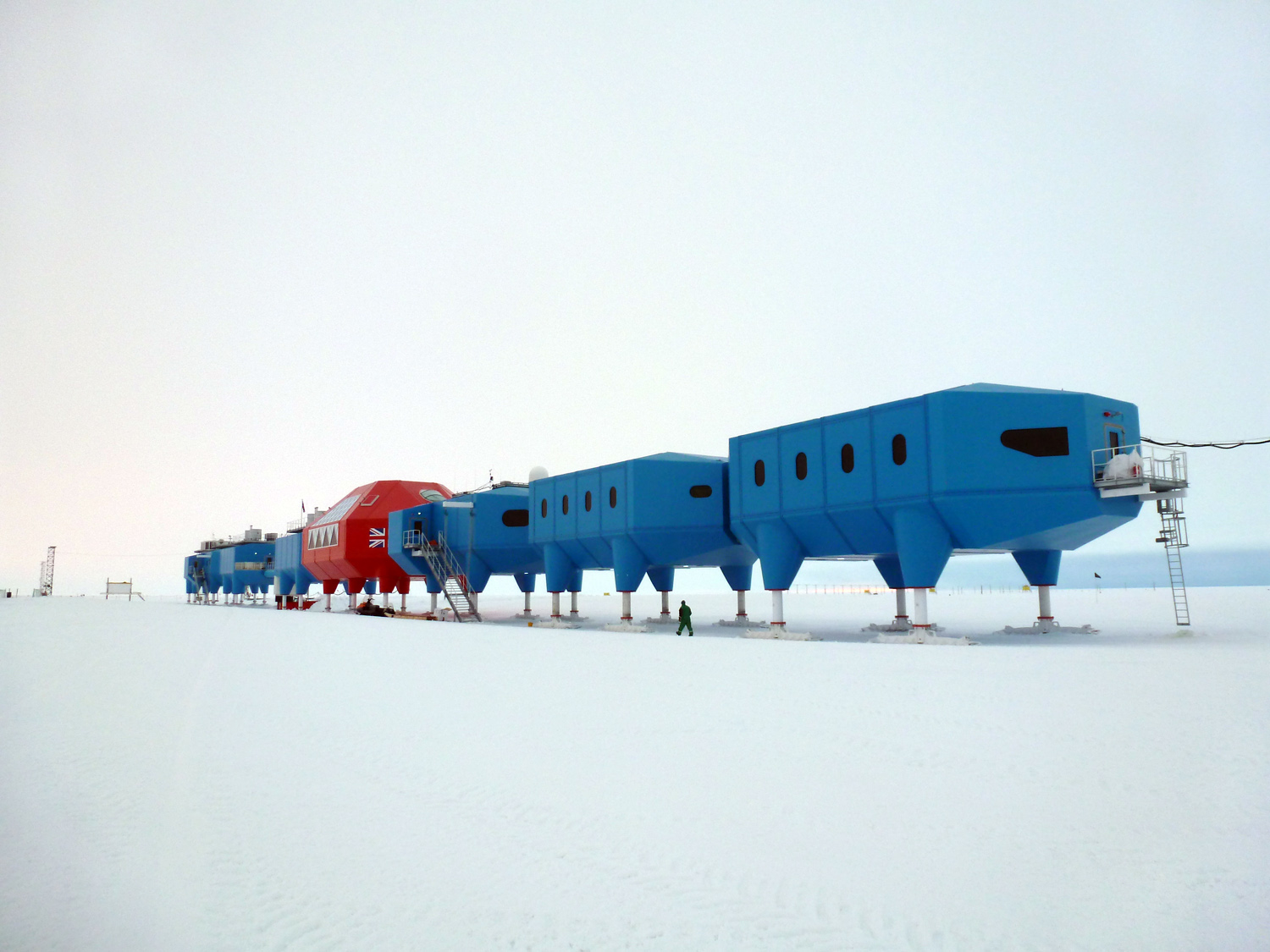
Halley VI

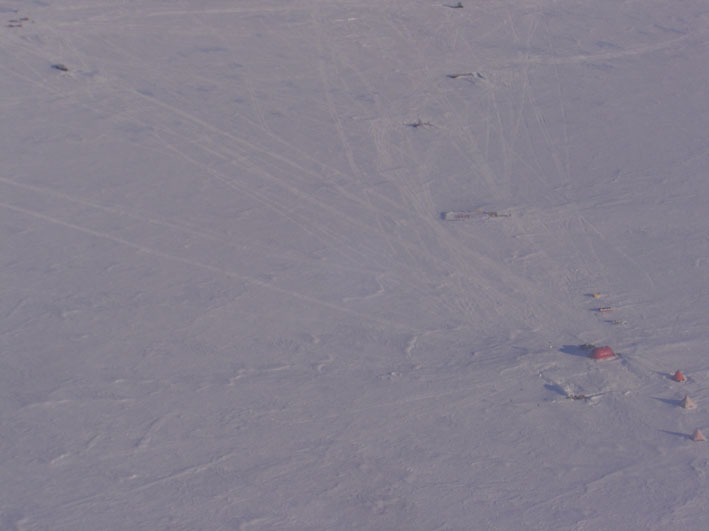
Sky Blu

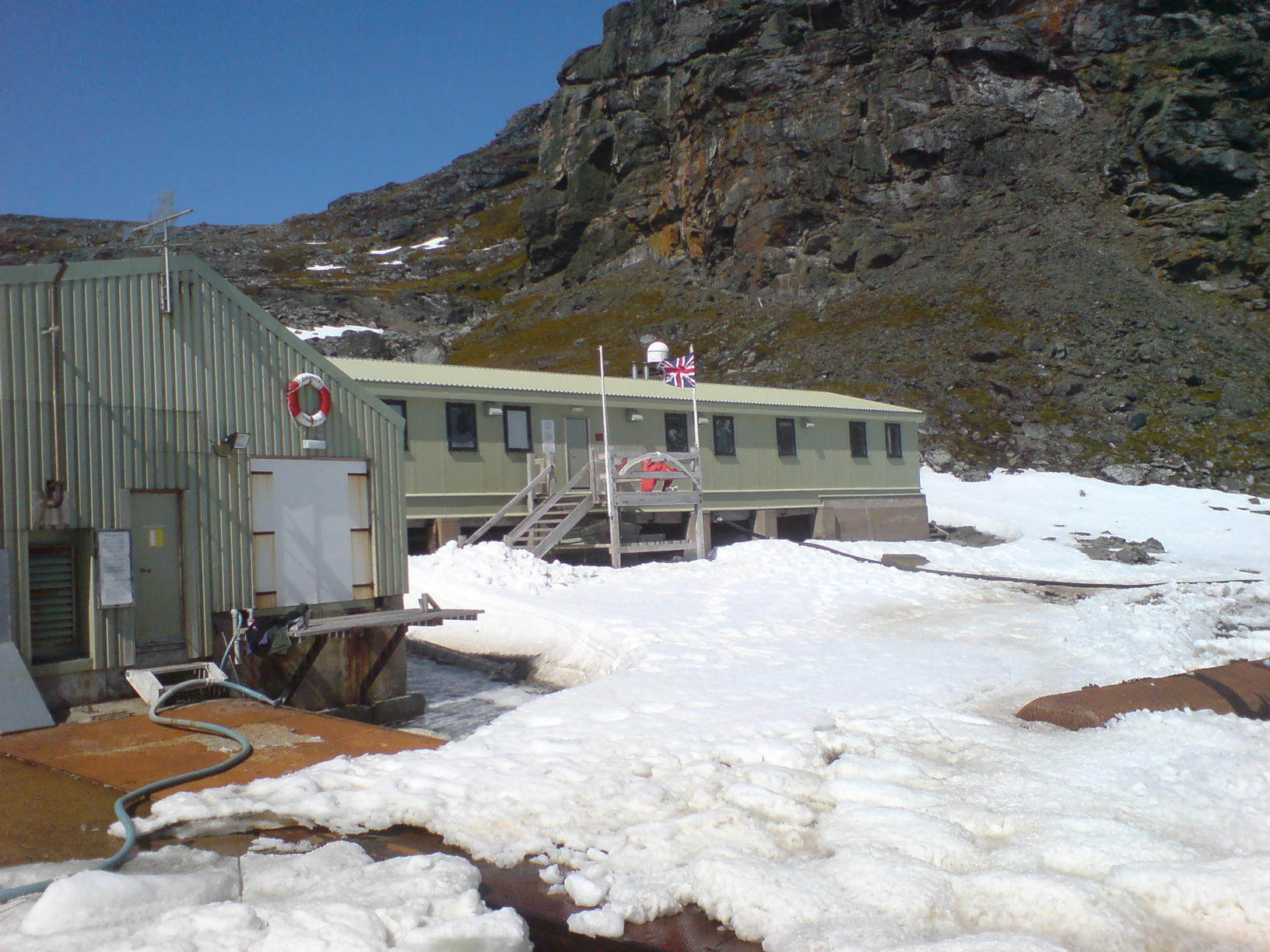
Signy

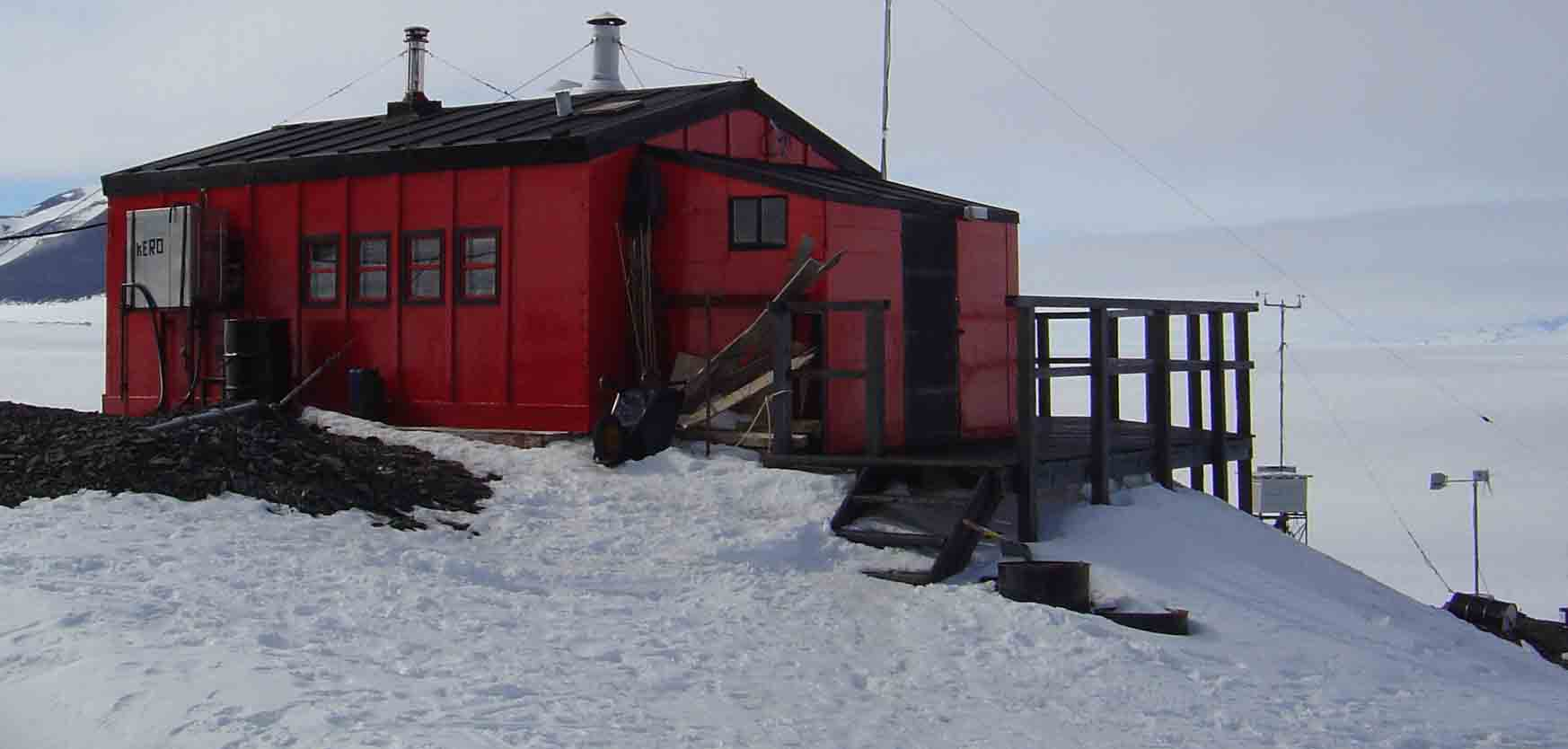
Fossil Bluff

=== South Georgia ===
BAS research stations in South Georgia

The BAS also operates two permanent bases on South Georgia:

- King Edward Point Research Station at King Edward Point
- Bird Island Research Station on Bird Island

Both South Georgia bases are staffed throughout the year.

=== Other sites ===
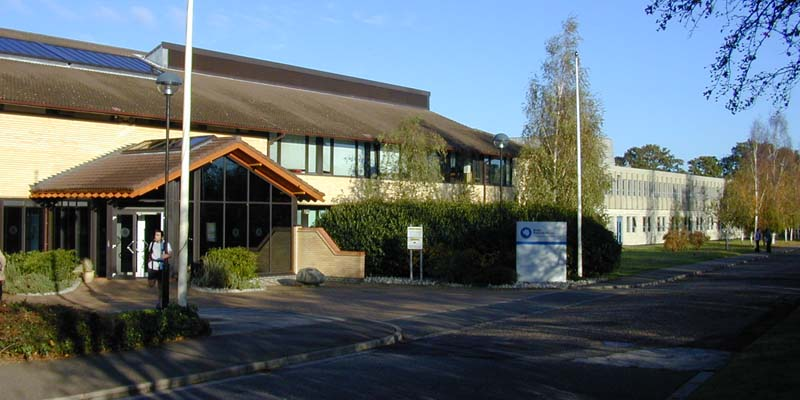
BAS headquarters

The headquarters of the BAS are in the university city of Cambridge, on Madingley Road. This facility provides offices, laboratories and workshops to support the scientific and logistic activities in the Antarctic.

The BAS also operates the Ny-Ålesund Research Station on behalf of the NERC. This is an Arctic research base located at Ny-Ålesund on the Norwegian island of Spitsbergen.

== Equipment ==
=== Ships ===
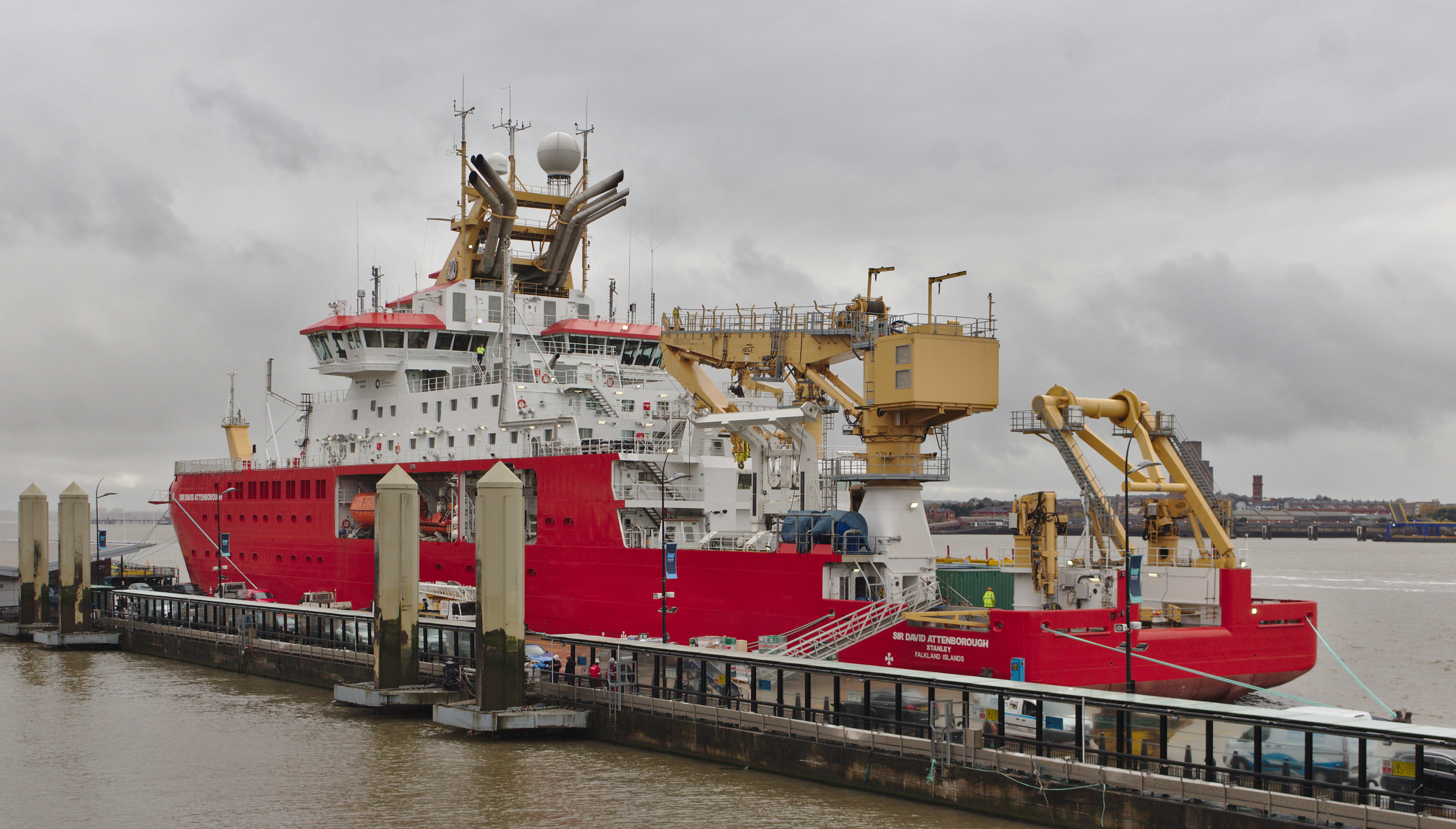
RRS Sir David Attenborough docked in Liverpool

As of 2021, the Survey operates one ship, the RRS Sir David Attenborough, for support of Arctic and Antarctic research operations, and other logistical work. It replaced RRS James Clark Ross and RRS Ernest Shackleton, which were sold in 2021 and returned to its owners in 2019, respectively. Originally, the Admiralty provided the FIDS (Note: Falkland Islands Dependencies Survey, direct predecessor to the BAS) with ship support. In 1947 the Survey purchased their first vessel, which was named MV John Biscoe, and in 1953 the same ship was granted Royal Research Ship status. Since then the Survey has owned and chartered several vessels.

Vessels depart from the United Kingdom in September or October of each year and return to the United Kingdom in the following May or June. Vessels undergo refit and drydock during the Antarctic winter, but are also used elsewhere during this period.

The civilian ships operated by the BAS are complemented by the capabilities of the Royal Navy's ice patrol vessel that operates in the same waters. Until 2008 this was HMS Endurance, a Class 1A1 icebreaker. Endurance's two Lynx helicopters enabled BAS staff to get to remote field sites that BAS aircraft could not access. However, a catastrophic flooding accident left Endurance badly damaged, with a replacement only being procured in 2011. This ship, HMS Protector, first deployed to the Antarctic in November 2011.

=== Aircraft ===
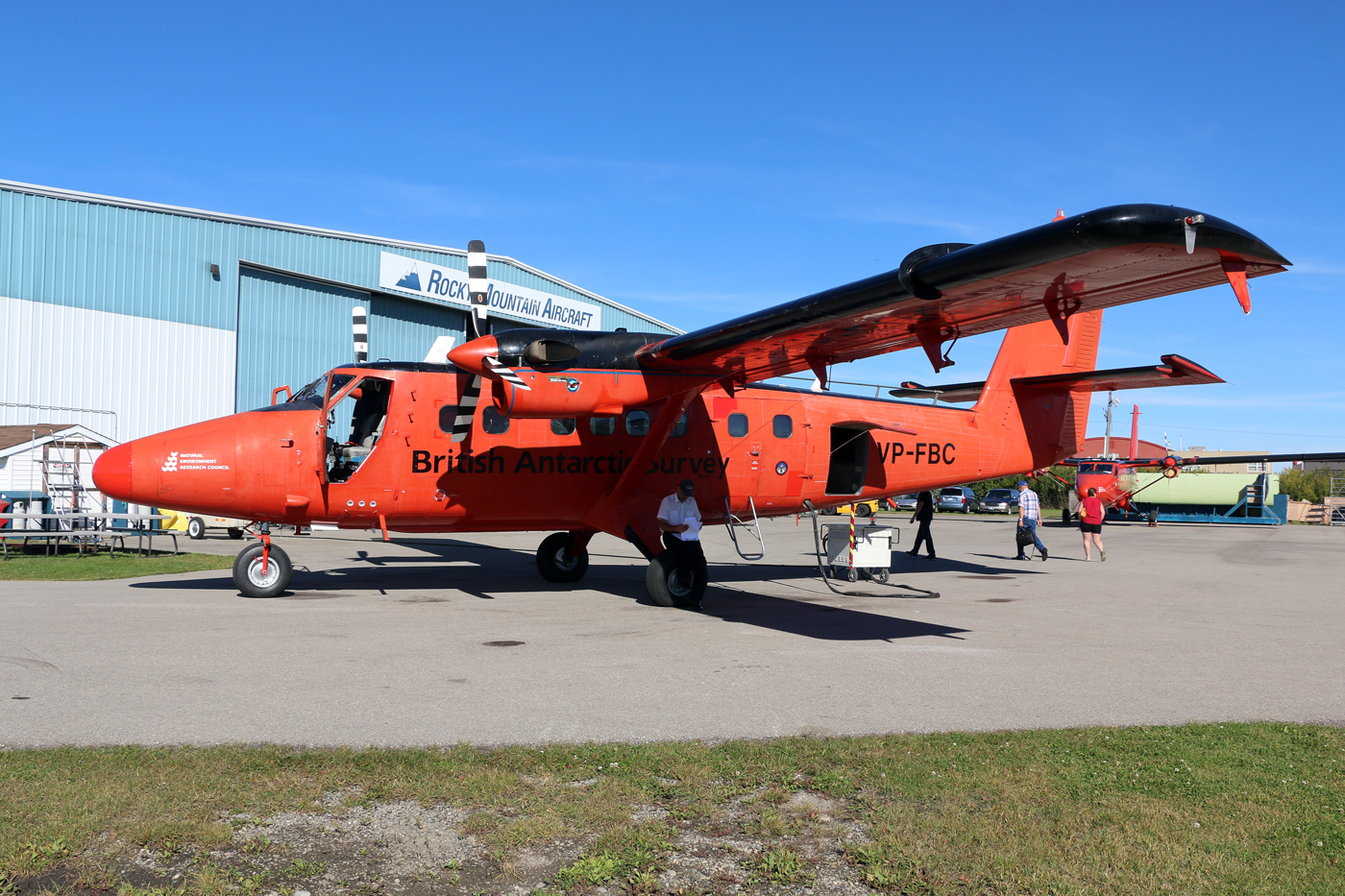
A BAS Twin Otter at Springbank

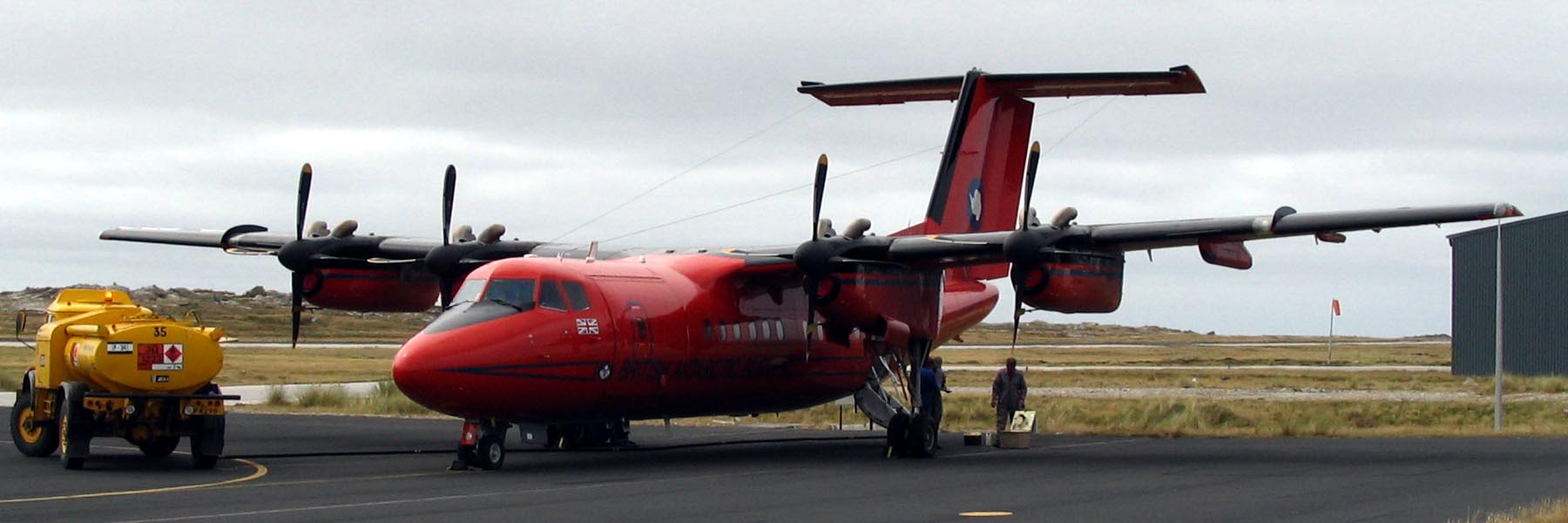
The BAS Dash-7 at Port Stanley Airport on the Falkland Islands

BAS operates five aircraft in support of its research programme in Antarctica. The aircraft used are all made by de Havilland Canada and comprise four Twin Otters and one Dash 7 (as of August 2025). The planes are maintained by Rocky Mountain Aircraft in Springbank, Alberta, Canada. During the Antarctic summer the aircraft are based at the Rothera base, which has a 900-metre gravel runway. During the Antarctic winter, conditions preclude flying and the aircraft return to Canada.

The larger Dash 7 undertakes regular shuttle flights between either Port Stanley Airport on the Falkland Islands, or Punta Arenas in Chile, and Rothera. It also operates to and from the ice runway at the Sky Blu base. The smaller Twin Otters are equipped with skis for landing on snow and ice in remote areas, and operate out of the bases at Rothera, Fossil Bluff, Halley and Sky Blu.

== Findings ==
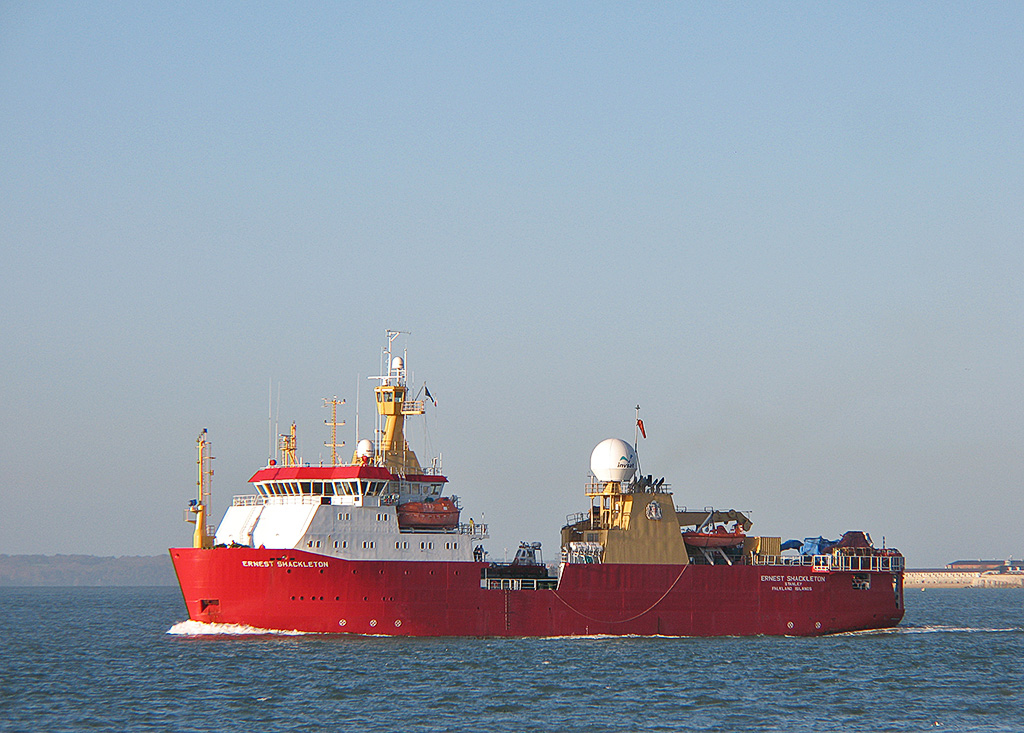
RRS Ernest Shackleton outward bound from Portsmouth, UK, 12 November 2008

In 1985, the British Antarctic Survey discovered the hole in the ozone layer over Antarctica. The finding was made by a team of three BAS scientists: Joe Farman, Brian Gardiner and Jonathan Shanklin. Their work was confirmed by satellite data, and was met with worldwide concern.

In January 2008, a team of British Antarctic Survey scientists, led by Hugh Corr and David Vaughan, reported that 2,200 years ago, a volcano erupted under Antarctica's ice sheet (based on airborne survey with radar images). The biggest eruption in the last 10,000 years, the volcanic ash was found deposited on the ice surface under the Hudson Mountains, close to Pine Island Glacier.

In 2020, a team reported that emperor penguin colonies in Antarctica were nearly 20% more numerous than previously thought, with new discoveries made using satellite mapping technology.

== Polar image collection ==
The BAS runs an online polar image collection which includes imagery of scientific research at the poles, logistics operations, and the continent and its wildlife. The image collection is run by British cameraman and photographer Pete Bucktrout, who has visited the continent eleven times during his 24 years working for BAS. His work has been seen in newspapers and on television around the world.

== See also ==
- Instituto Antártico Argentino (Argentine Antarctic Institute)
- Instituto Antártico Chileno (Chilean Antarctic Institute)
- Operation Tabarin
- British Antarctic Territory
- Faraday Research Station
- List of organizations based in Antarctica
- National Antarctic Program
