= Brighton i360 =

Observation tower in Brighton, England

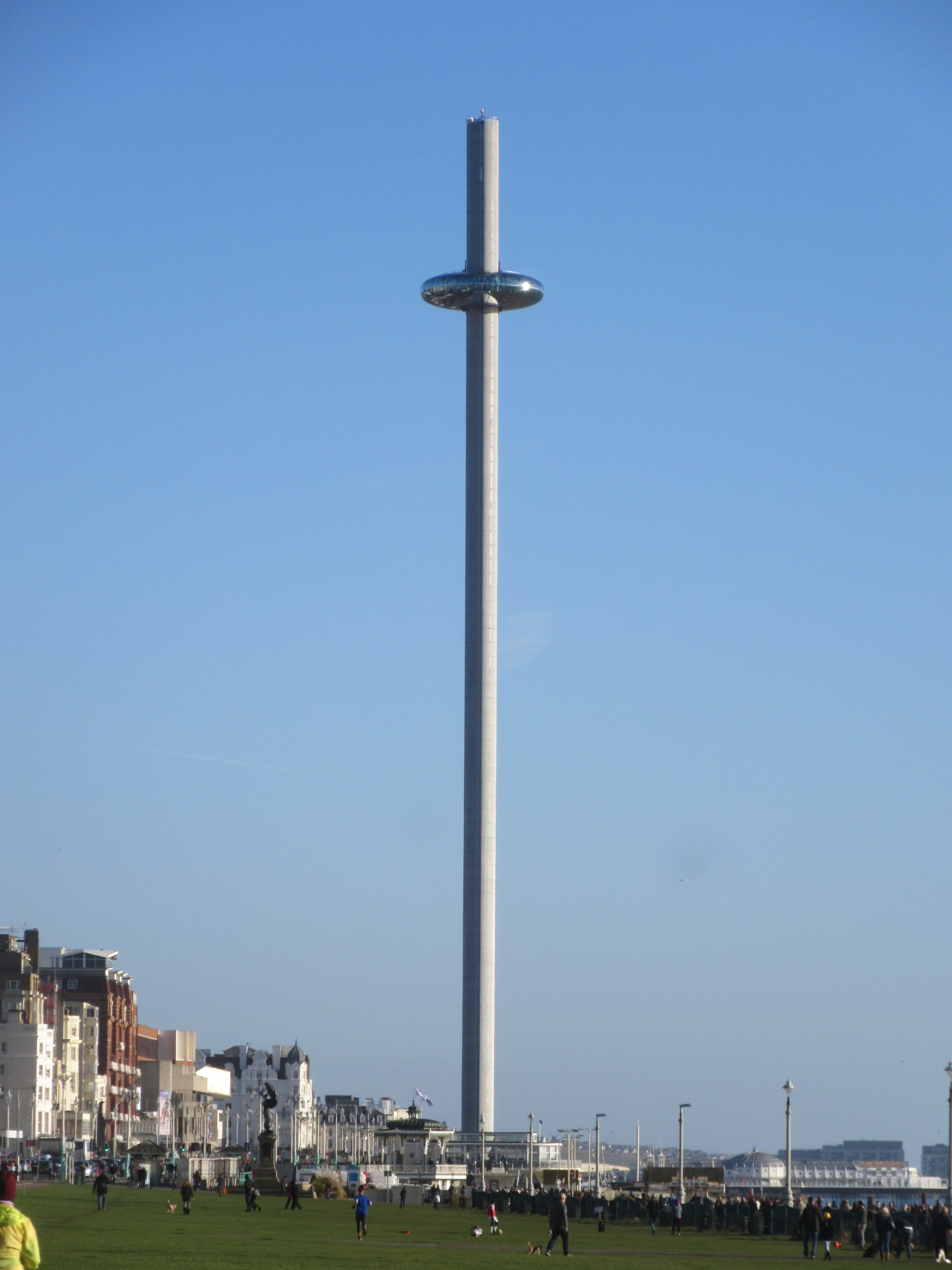
- View of the i360 from King's Road in 2018

- Location within East Sussex Location within England

General information
- Status: Completed
- Type: Observation tower
- Location: Brighton & Hove, England
- Coordinates: 50.8214°N 0.1507°W
- Groundbreaking: 29 July 2014
- Estimated completion: Summer 2016
- Opening: 4 August 2016
- Cost: £46.2 million

Height
- Height: 162 m (531 ft)

Design and construction
- Architects: David Marks and Julia Barfield
- Architecture firm: Marks Barfield
- Structural engineer: Jacobs Engineering
- Main contractor: Hollandia Infra BV

Website
- brightoni360.co.uk

Brighton i360 is a 162-metre (531 ft) moving observation tower on the seafront of Brighton, East Sussex, England, at the landward end of the remains of the West Pier. The tower opened on 4 August 2016. From the fully enclosed viewing pod, visitors experience 360-degree views across Brighton, the South Downs and the English Channel.

Brighton i360 was designed, engineered, manufactured and promoted by the team responsible for the London Eye. The attraction cost £46 million, with £36 million being funded by a Public Works Loan Board (PWLB) loan through Brighton and Hove City Council. Planning permission was granted in 2006, with the then Labour leader of the council, Simon Burgess, stating that "It is going to transform the city. The i360 will be a familiar picture postcard image - recognisable throughout the world. It will generate huge amounts of cash and benefit the city's economy all year round."

The following year the Secretary of State for Transport, Douglas Alexander, amended legislation which would have otherwise threatened the project due to restrictive land lease terms. The Brighton West Pier Harbour Revision Order 2007 granted under the then Labour government conferred powers to the Brighton West Pier Trust for leasing the pier and making byelaws to regulate the pier, allowing the i360 project to move forward.

Formerly known as the British Airways i360 for sponsorship purposes, the project originally aimed to attract 739,000 paying customers every year. The owner of the site, the West Pier Trust, hoped in 2014 that a successful i360 would lead to the rebuilding of the historic West Pier. Visitor numbers never reached those projected and, in December 2022, having also felt the impact of the Covid-19 pandemic on the tourism industry, the i360 defaulted on the debt it owed the council. By June 2023, the i360's debt to the council was more than £48 million, a figure around £12 million more than the original loan agreed. In November 2024, the company running the attraction filed for administration. The i360 entered administration and closed with immediate effect on 20 December 2024. On 4 February 2025, it was announced the i360 would reopen following the purchase by Nightcap Ltd. The new owners paid £150,000, with the city council agreeing to write off £51 million of outstanding debt. The i360 reopened to the public on 8 March 2025.

== Design ==
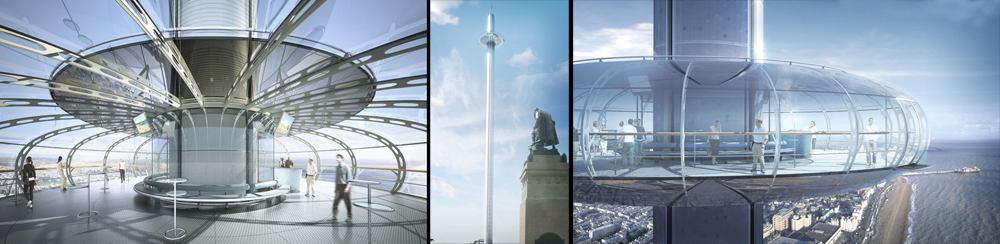
Original design artwork of the tower

Brighton i360 was designed by the architectural company Marks Barfield, which also designed the London Eye. The building was conceived as a "vertical pier". The tower is located at the shore end of the ruined West Pier, and the design recreated the original Italianate ticket booths of the West Pier, placed on either side of the entrance, serving as ticket office and tea room. The design also includes a beachfront building that allows access to the tower and houses a café and gift shop.

The tower is designed as a 162-metre (531 ft) tall needle structure with an ascending and descending circular viewing platform with capacity for 200 people.

The tower's initial design had included a wind turbine at the top and rainwater harvesting facilities, to help mitigate the attraction's environmental impact. In October 2015 the developers dropped both these proposals, claiming that the turbine would have stopped the tower's damping system from working and be susceptible to wind damage, and that the water would be "too dirty to be usable".

== Construction ==
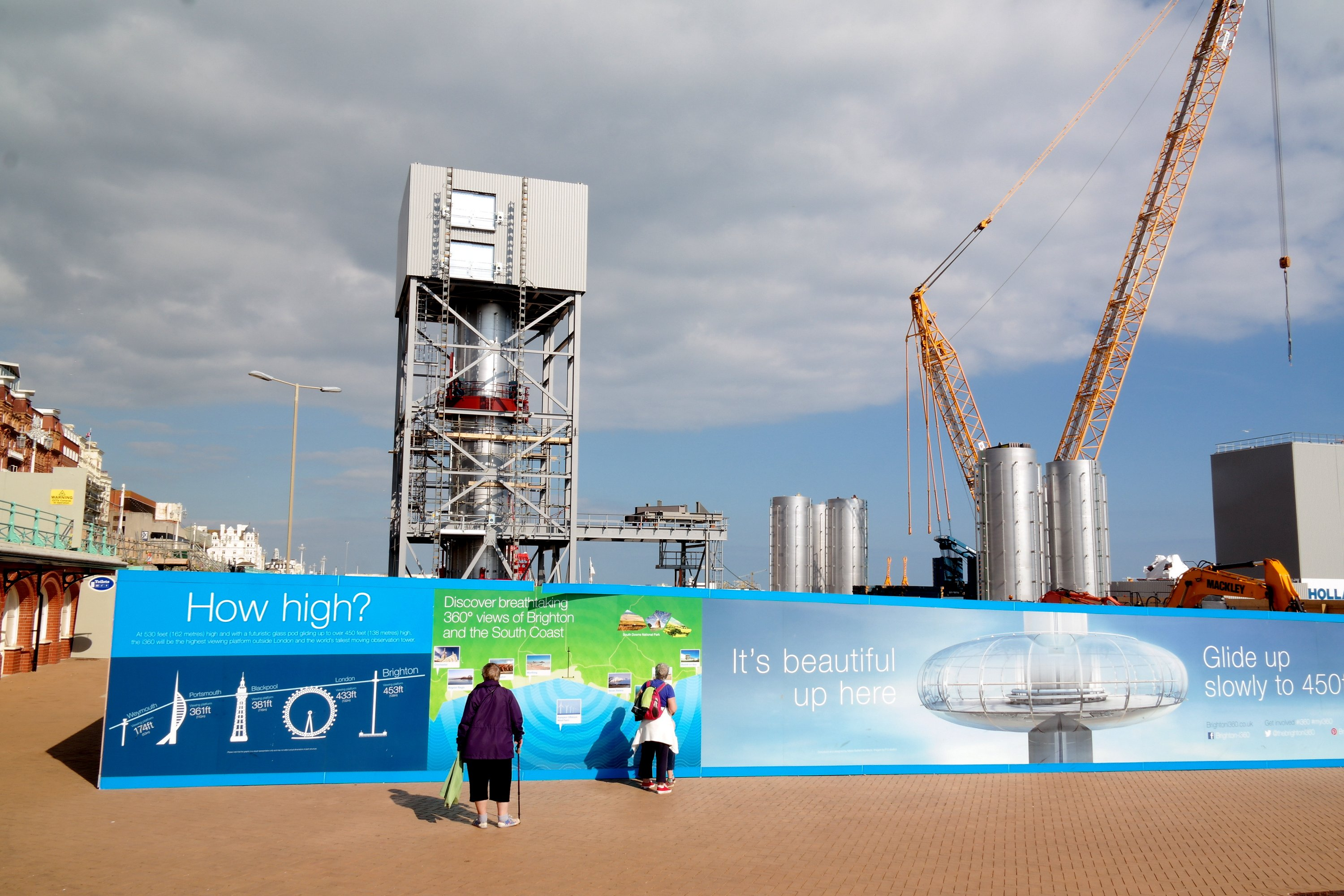
Under construction behind boarding, June 2015

Plans were submitted in June 2006 and were approved by Brighton and Hove City Council later that year with construction projected to start in 2007. Following delays of around 15 months, the off-site construction of the sections of the tower began in 2008 in the Netherlands, advanced piling works at the West Pier site started in October 2009 and work on reconstructing the arches beneath and to the east of the pier to allow the tower construction began in November 2012. Work on the tower itself began in May 2014, with the attraction being scheduled to open in 2016.

The Dutch steelwork specialist Hollandia prefabricated the cylindrical steel sections of the tower, known by the team as cans. The column is 3.9 metres (13 ft) in diameter, and with a height-to-width ratio of 41.15 to one.

The glass passenger pod was designed and built by cable car specialists Poma, which also built the London Eye capsules. The passenger pod is 18 metres (59 ft) in diameter and holds up to 200 people. The viewing pod travels from street level to a height of 138 metres (453 ft) before returning to beach level. The pod provides a 360-degree view through curved glass and is heated and air-conditioned, with full wheelchair accessibility and bench seating. It also contains a bar and restaurant in the base building.

English Heritage felt that the 2006 plan would "provide an outstanding feature on the seafront, and a worthy companion to any successor to the West Pier". In a statement, the West Pier Trust hoped that the project would "regenerate a key blighted city site and send out a loud message that Brighton is open for business".

The project was the winner of the Judges' Special Award at the British Construction Industry Awards 2017. It also won The Award for Tall or Slender Structures and The Supreme Award for Structural Engineering Excellence at The Institution of Structural Engineers' Structural Awards 2017.

== Finance ==
The project was initially intended to be entirely privately funded. The architect, Marks Barfield, sold its stake in the London Eye and found financial backers to build the tower. Following the 2008 financial crisis, Marks Barfield approached the city council for a loan. The council initially agreed to support the build with a £14.8 million loan, but this was raised after an unnamed private equity investor told the architects it could no longer proceed and withdrew its planned £15 million contribution in 2012. In March 2014, the project was expected to cost £46 million, with Brighton and Hove City Council lending £36.2 million from the Public Works Loan Board and architects Marks Barfield contributing £6 million. The deal included Marks Barfield paying £1 million annual profit to the council.

Critics say the case for the i360 was based on unrealistic projections of visitor numbers, figures the council kept secret, even fighting in the courts to prevent them being revealed. Council officials argued that "release of the full, unredacted business case would prejudice the commercial interests of the i360 and the council." The figures were accidentally revealed to The Argus in October 2022, when the paper revealed that "the Brighton i360's revenues could be roughly half of what politicians were told they would be before they granted the taxpayer-backed loan, the business case today reveals." The figures suggested that there would be 822,584 visitors in the first year of operation, with more than 700,000 visitors in following years.

The £36.2 million loan was agreed at a Special Policy & Resources Committee in March 2014, the council agreeing to more than replace the lost investment capital and to again borrow from the Public Works Loan Board to effect the new bailout. The Coast to Capital local enterprise partnership (LEP) loan of £3 million was raised to £4 million. The West Pier Trust had suggested the project "will cost the taxpayer nothing", but some residents expressed concerns that any repayment risk would be borne by the residents of Brighton & Hove. The council has said that if the loan were not repaid, it would have the option to take over the attraction, find another operator or sell it.

In June 2018, disappointing visitor numbers forced the owners to ask Brighton and Hove City Council and the LEP for better loan repayment terms. Brighton and Hove News reported that "in the first full year, from August 2016, the i360 had just over 500,000 visitors, significantly fewer than the 800,000 predicted." The shortfall in visitors was "blamed on poor weather and the unreliable train service to and from London."

Between July and December 2022, the loan accrued interest of more than £323,000. The council carried out "cash sweeps", where it took any spare cash from the tower. The first of these occurred in June 2022, where the council took £700,000 to offset the debt. Repayments were set to increase and continue until 2046. In December 2022, the i360 was unable to make the required second payment.

In February 2023, the council was forced to set aside £2.2 million a year from its budget to cover future missed repayments.

At a council meeting in Hove town hall on 27 February 2023, the Green leader of the council, Phélim Mac Cafferty, said: "Only a few days ago, we had to set the budget. It has been absolutely horrendous. What we would also need to hear is some contrition, some reflection that this is adding to the burden on the city ... The rest of us can look up and down the coast and see places like Shelter Hall doing really well. What has been missing from the board that means you haven't been able to do that?" The terms required a total payment of almost £1.5 million during 2023, with repayments scheduled for June and December. In June £250,000 was repaid: no further payments were made. By 2024 the outstanding debt to the council was £50 million and it was calculated that the loan would have taken 400 years to be repaid. The company running the i360 filed for administration in November 2024. On 20 December 2024, the Brighton i360 went into administration and closed.

On 4 February 2025, it was announced the i360 would reopen following the purchase by Nightcap Ltd. The attraction was purchased for £150,000. Brighton and Hove City Council wrote off the £51 million debt as part of the sale. As of May 2025 £32 million of this debt is still owed to the government from the council, with repayments scheduled to continue over the following 16 years.

On 8 March 2025, the i360 reopened to the public.

In March 2026 the Chartered Institute of Public Finance and Accountancy (CIPFA) published a highly-critical report examining the project's funding model. The report found that city council's refusal to publish the project's business case, on the grounds of commercial confidentiality, had led to a lack of independent scrutiny: and that this had led to important chances being missed to make better decisions which might have prevented the business from failing in 2024. In addition, the financial projections, based on unrealistic visitor numbers and revenue per visitor in terms of secondary spending, "proved (to be) overly ambitious (and the) business plan demonstrated optimism bias". The report highlighted the poor decision-making in comparing the proposed project to "iconic global landmarks such as the London Eye, Eiffel Tower, CN Tower, Empire State Building, Berlin TV Tower, Willis Tower and the Auckland Sky Tower (which) operate at a scale and within destination markets that bear little resemblance to the local regional context" and found that "the approach should have primarily focused on benchmarking against domestic attractions such as the Spinnaker Tower, Blackpool Tower and Sea Life Brighton."

With regard to the financial risk assessment, the report commented that it "did not sufficiently address the scenario in which the attraction fails to generate sufficient revenue, leading to loan defaults and substantial financial losses. The risk register did not account for optimism bias, particularly in the context of visitor number projections and revenue forecasts ... The absence of such adjustments contributed to inflated expectations that were not adequately stress-tested, increasing the risk of financial shortfall."

== Opening and operation ==
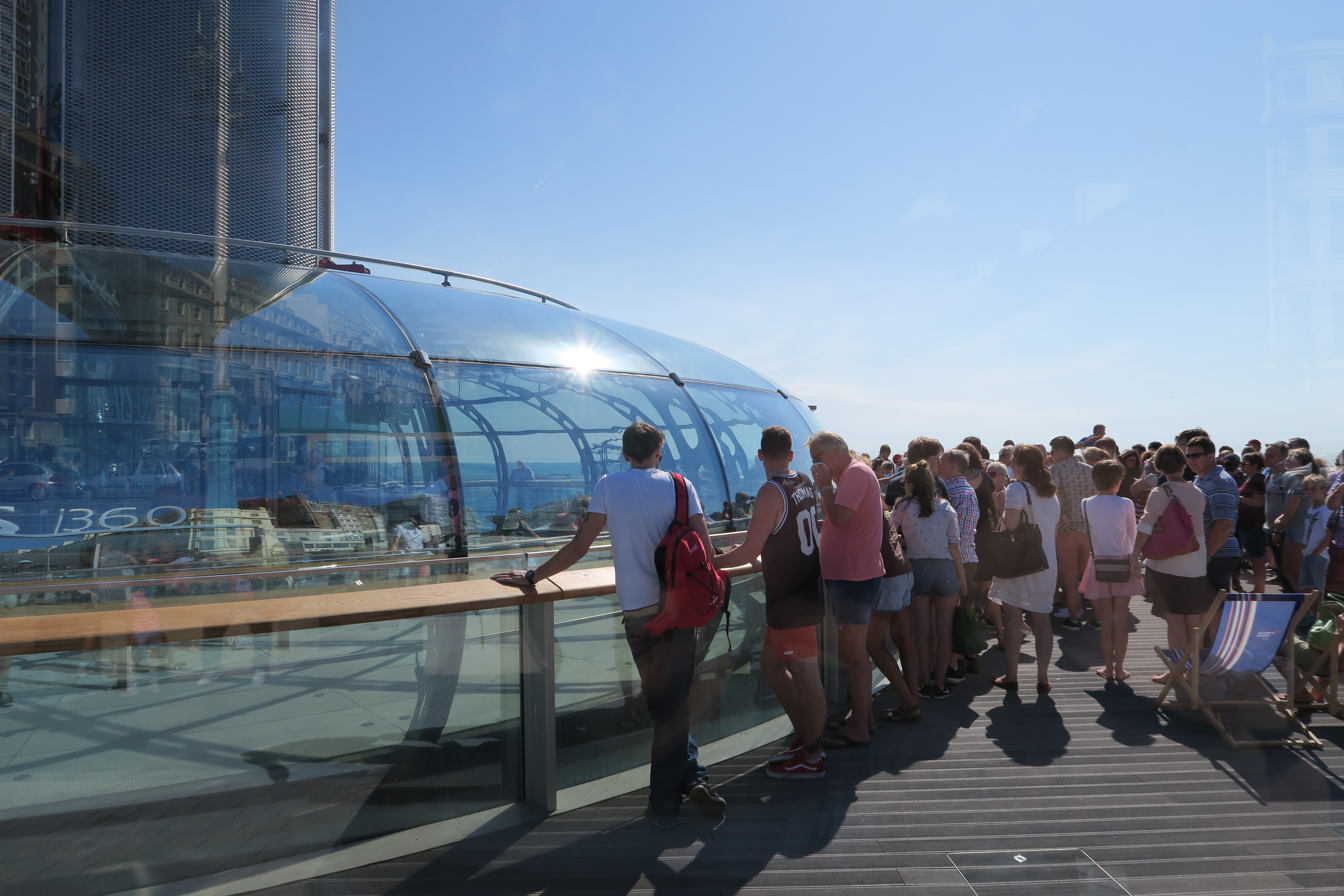
Passengers preparing to enter the i360 pod

Brighton i360 opened on 4 August 2016. A scheduled fireworks display was delayed for a week due to a storm off the coast. The operator's website states that "flights" depart every 30 minutes, with rides lasting approximately 25 minutes.

The pod was vandalised within the first few weeks of operation, with a foot-long crack in the glass being repaired after it was noticed by customers. A spokeswoman described the damage as "aesthetic" that held no risk to customers' safety.

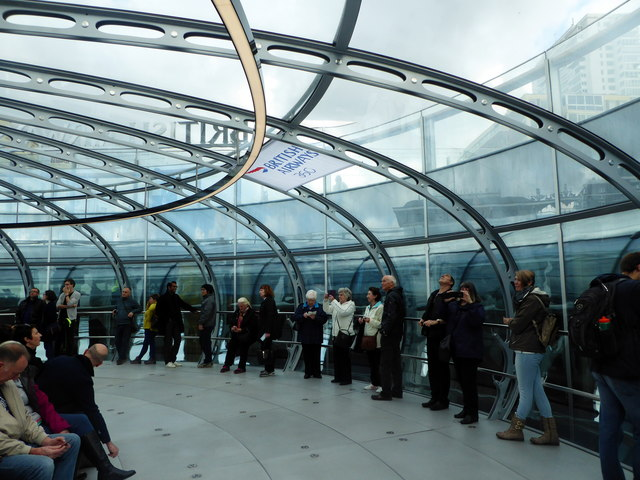
Interior of the i360 pod

The i360 experienced operational issues a month after opening. On two occasions in September 2016 the i360's pod became stuck. A "slight technical fault" resulted in passengers being stranded 9 metres (30 ft) above ground for a time. Just days later 200 visitors were trapped at ground level for over an hour. The tower was closed for a day for checks. A broken cable in February 2017 caused passengers to become stuck part way through the ride for two hours, and the i360 was closed over the weekend for repairs. In March 2017, the tower was closed due to a temporary fault; the third time the attraction has been closed since it opened.

In January 2022, it was announced that British Airways would end its sponsorship of the tower when naming rights expired on 3 November 2022. In October 2022, it was announced that the tower would no longer have a sponsor and that from 1 November 2022 would instead just be called the "Brighton i360". The rebrand included new livery, a new lighting scheme for the tower and pod, the logo being changed to a pink and white design featuring a graphic of the tower, and new signage for the attraction.

== Opposition ==
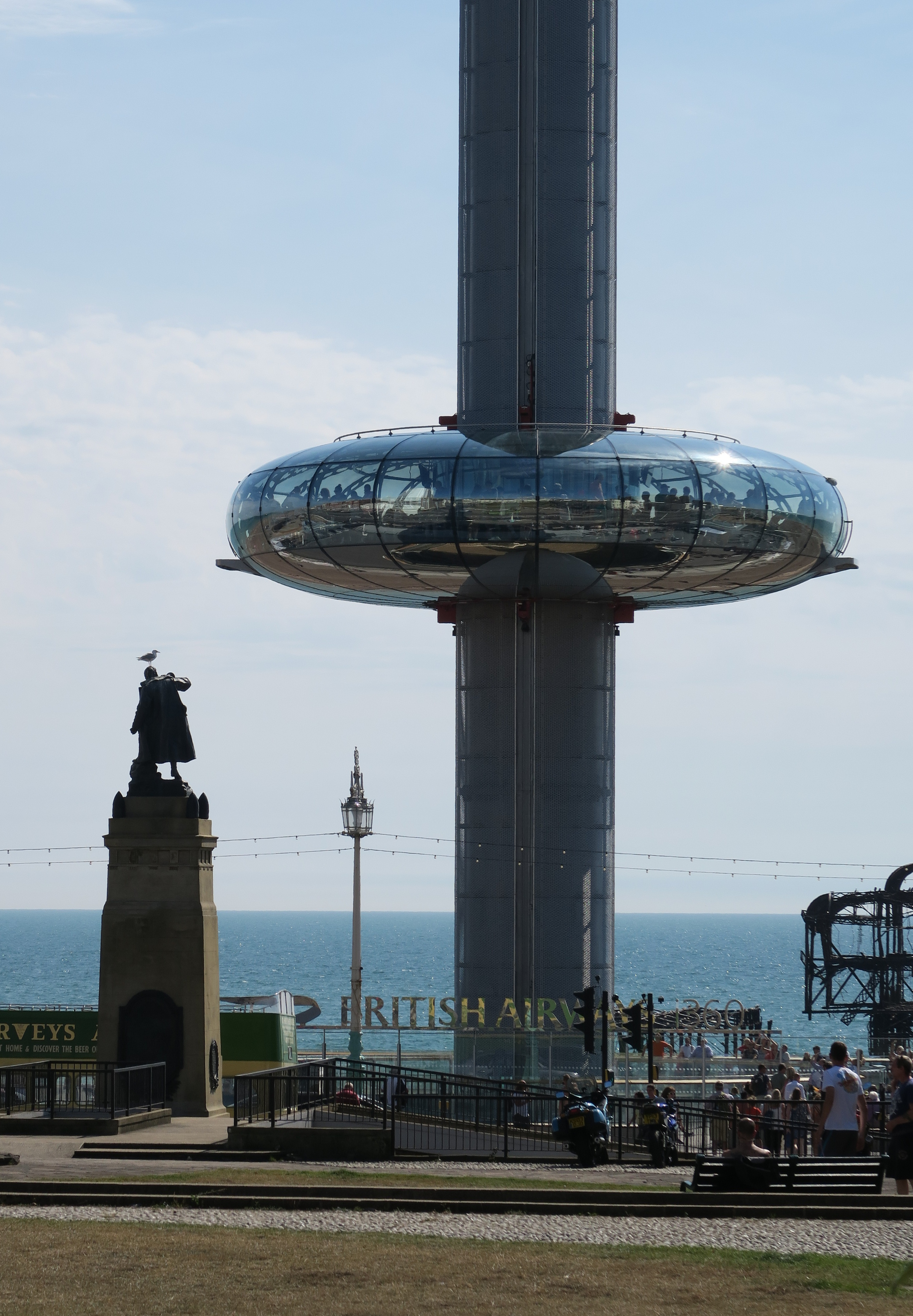
View of i360 from Regency Square. Ruins of the West Pier just visible on the right

Although the Labour group on the council championed the project at the outset in 2006, and they maintained their support for the i360 for eight years, just a year before the local elections due to take place in May 2015 they changed their position and withdrew their support. Similarly, a year before the local elections due to take place in May 2023, the Labour group on the council began to describe the i360 as a "Green/Tory vanity project" noting that "with 100% public funding when private sector partners could not be found ... It was a flawed business model from the outset – as we tried to convince our Green and Conservative colleagues of at the time." Yet, when the i360 opened in 2016, then council leader, Labour's Warren Morgan, spoke positively about the attraction, which he noted would be "a great addition to our seafront." Councillor Morgan also sat on the planning committee which granted planning permission for the i360 in 2006. Irrespective of the reasons for the timing of any position change on the Labour group's part, the i360 has become a politically contentious issue in the city.

The Noble Organisation, then owners of Brighton's Palace Pier also objected to the i360 plans. The West Pier Trust needed approval from the Department of Transport due to a Victorian law which prevented the land at the base of the West Pier from being leased out for more than three years at a time. Noble objected to the plans on the grounds the tower would increase competition along the seafront and have a negative effect on its profits. When the Department for Transport gave the go-ahead, the then leader of the council, Simon Burgess, called it "fantastic news" noting that he had been worried the developers would have walked away from the project if the Department for Transport did not reach this decision "This has been the one thing holding this development up and making us nervous. It will be so nice to see one of these dramatic developments to really get going. They could have taken it anywhere. The risk was them contemplating building somewhere else."

Rachel Clark from the West Pier Trust also dismissed the concerns raised by the Palace Pier's then owners, stating that "It can only be that Noble were fearful of competition. A conservative estimate is that 500,000 visitors will come to the i360 every year. A significant proportion will go on the Palace Pier. It will benefit the whole of Brighton. There will be no loss."

Rosemary Behan, in The Times, wrote "That such a monumental eyesore has been given planning permission is almost beyond belief. Some 150ft taller than the London Eye, this thick steel pole, with its doughnut-shaped pod, will dominate everything in sight." Writing in The Independent on the day following the launch, Janet Street-Porter described it as "a piss-poor replacement for Brighton's West Pier."

During the planning and construction of the tower, a number of local residents and groups campaigned against the building of the tower and the public loan, with a petition gaining 1,449 signatures, including those of architects Paul Zara of Conran & Partners and Paul Nicholson of Chalk Architecture; the writer and broadcaster Simon Fanshawe and Malcolm Dawes, chairman of the Brighton Society. Zara later become a supporter of the i360, declaring, "We should embrace it."

== Debunked Guinness World Record claims ==
During promotions at the time of the tower's opening, its owners claimed that the i360 was "the world's tallest moving observation tower". The Guinness World Record title was later revoked after Guinness discovered that the 152 metres (500 ft) Top o'Texas Tower, which opened in 2013, had a moving platform which reached a greater height: the Advertising Standards Authority subsequently ordered British Airways to cease advertising the i360 in this way. Further publicity at the time of opening claimed that the i360 was also the world's most slender tower: as of 2026 this record is also currently held by the Top o'Texas Tower.

== Other uses ==
In September 2021, car manufacturer Caterham Cars used the i360 as a car dealership showroom to mark the launch of the company's entry-level Seven 170, its lightest ever production car.

The Seven 170 was displayed alongside other Caterham models in the i360's operation deck. At 137 metres (449 ft) in the air, this temporarily created the world's highest car showroom.

In October 2022, Sam Ryder filmed the music video for his song "Somebody" performing on the roof of the tower's pod.

In November 2022, violinist Esther Abrami released a music video of "Walking in the Air" composed and arranged by Howard Blake for violin and piano, featuring a nighttime performance from the roof of the tower.

In June 2023, the council approved plans to site three shipping containers next to the i360 temporarily to house a virtual cricket game known as Sixes Social Cricket. The i360 stated that the immersive game was part of a plan to draw more people to the venue, with a chance to "eat, drink and bat" in each of the three containers. The attraction opened in July 2024 and closed four months later when the i360 fell into administration. Following the i360's relaunch in March 2025 under new management, it was confirmed that the Sixes would not be reopening.

Lessons Learnt Report (2026) Brighton and Hove City Council commissioned a report from The Chartered Institute of Public Finance and Accountancy. Final Version February 2026. (https://www.brighton-hove.gov.uk/city-regeneration/major-developments/brighton-i360-lessons-learnt). There were reported claims that Green Councillors had attempted to block publication of the Report as it was critical of the Green Council. (https://www.theargus.co.uk/news/26064878.brighton-i360-report-row-continues-emails-revealed/)

== Gallery ==
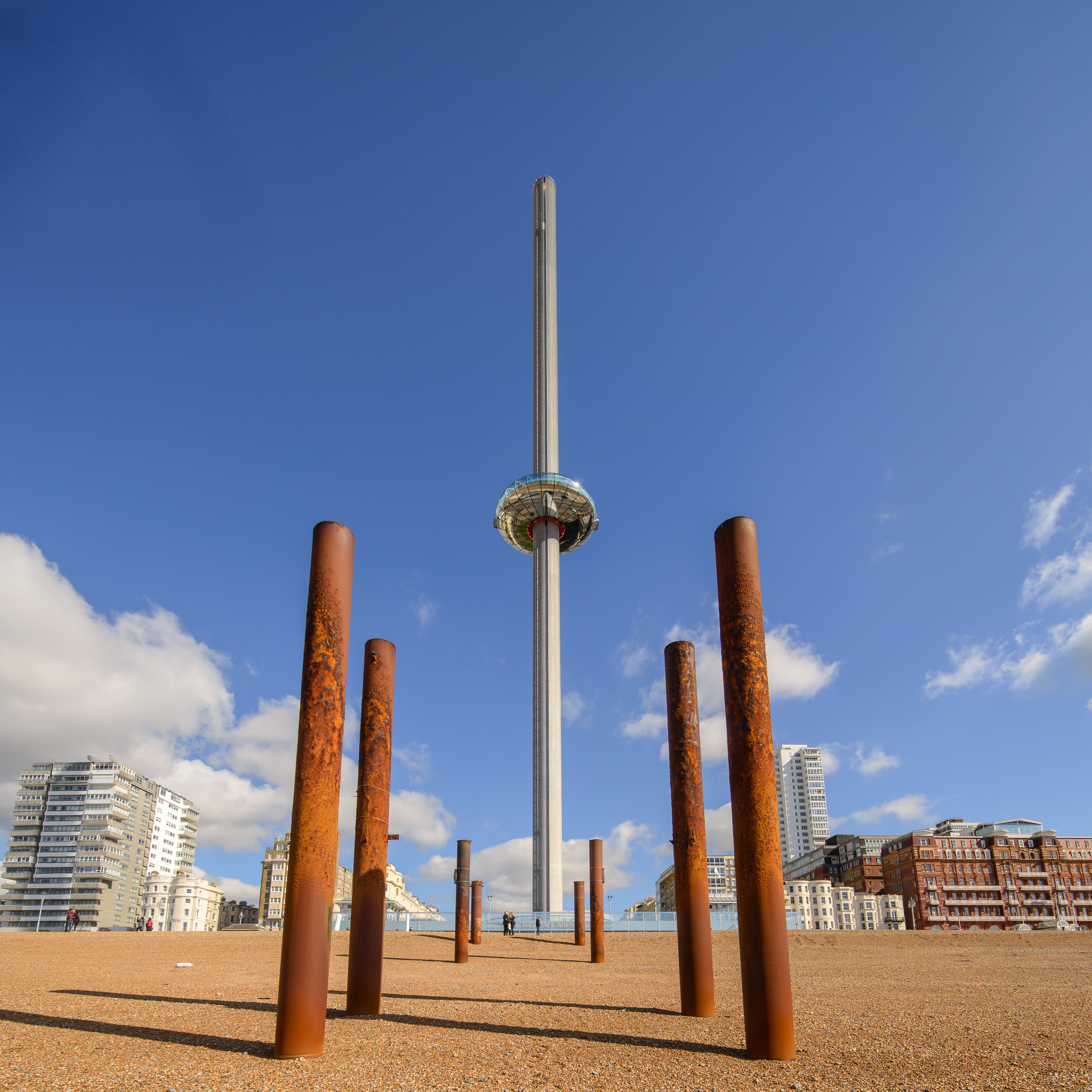
View of the i360 from the site of the former West Pier

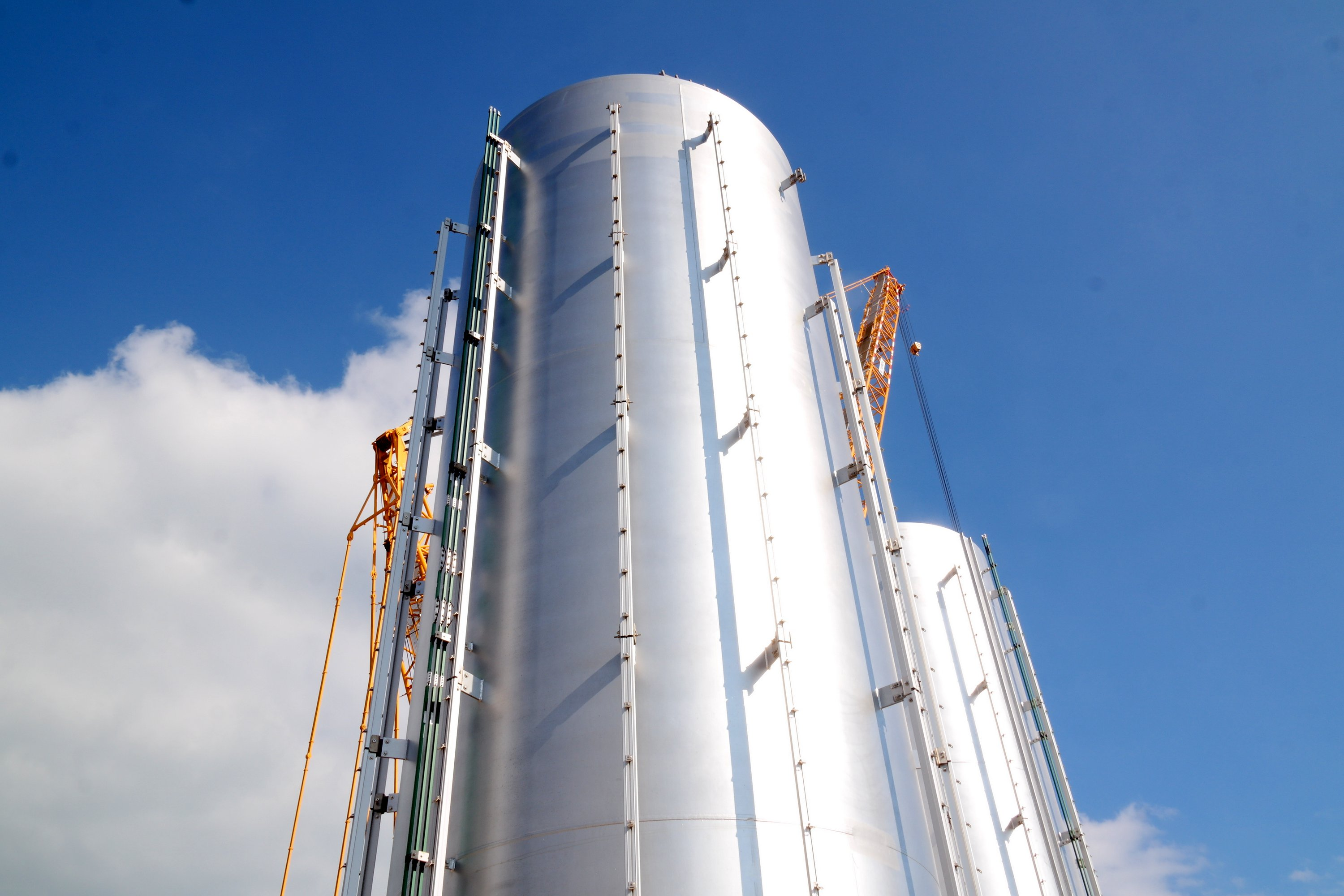
Column sections lined up and waiting to be assembled, June 2015

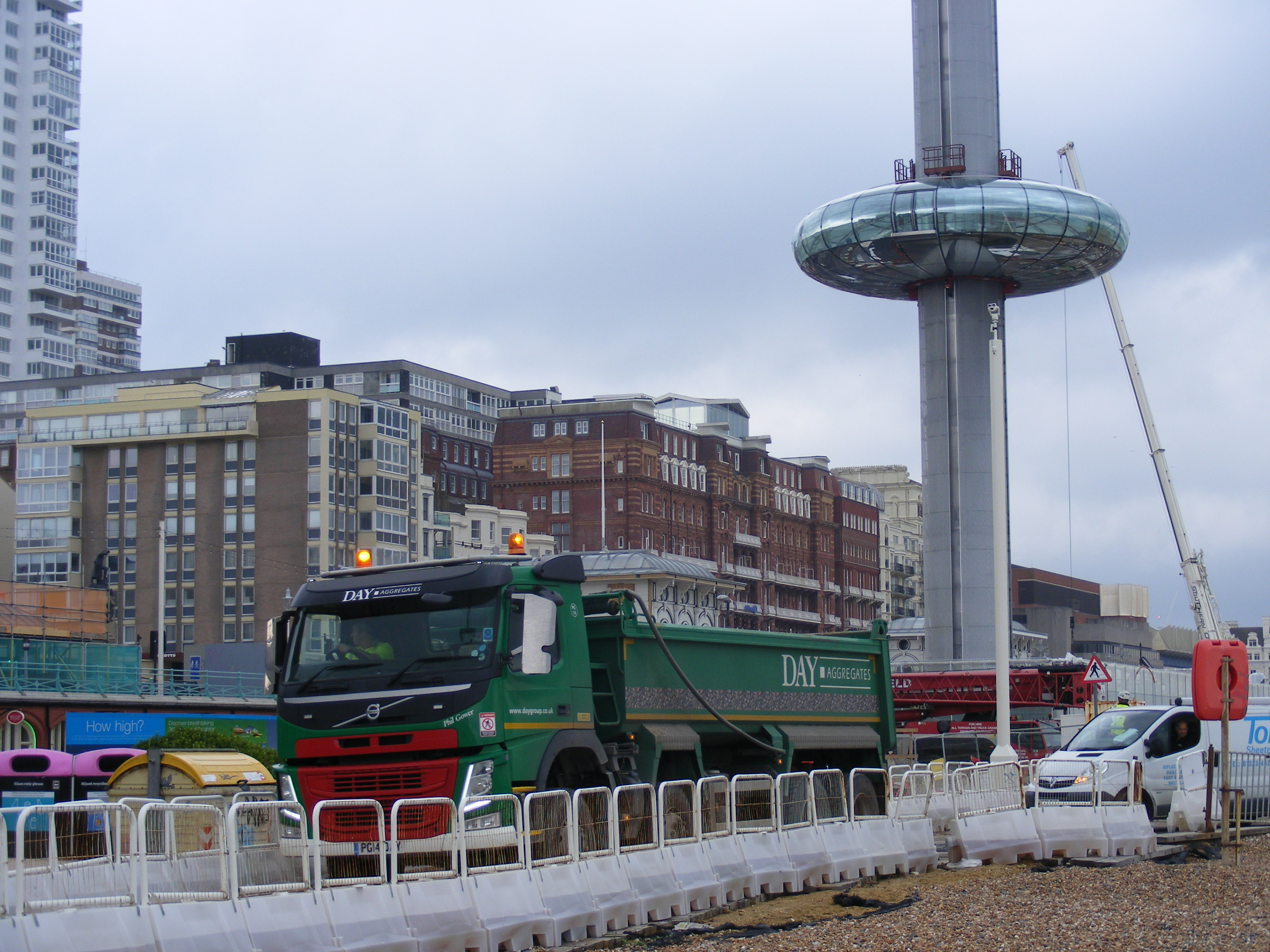
The site under construction in June 2016

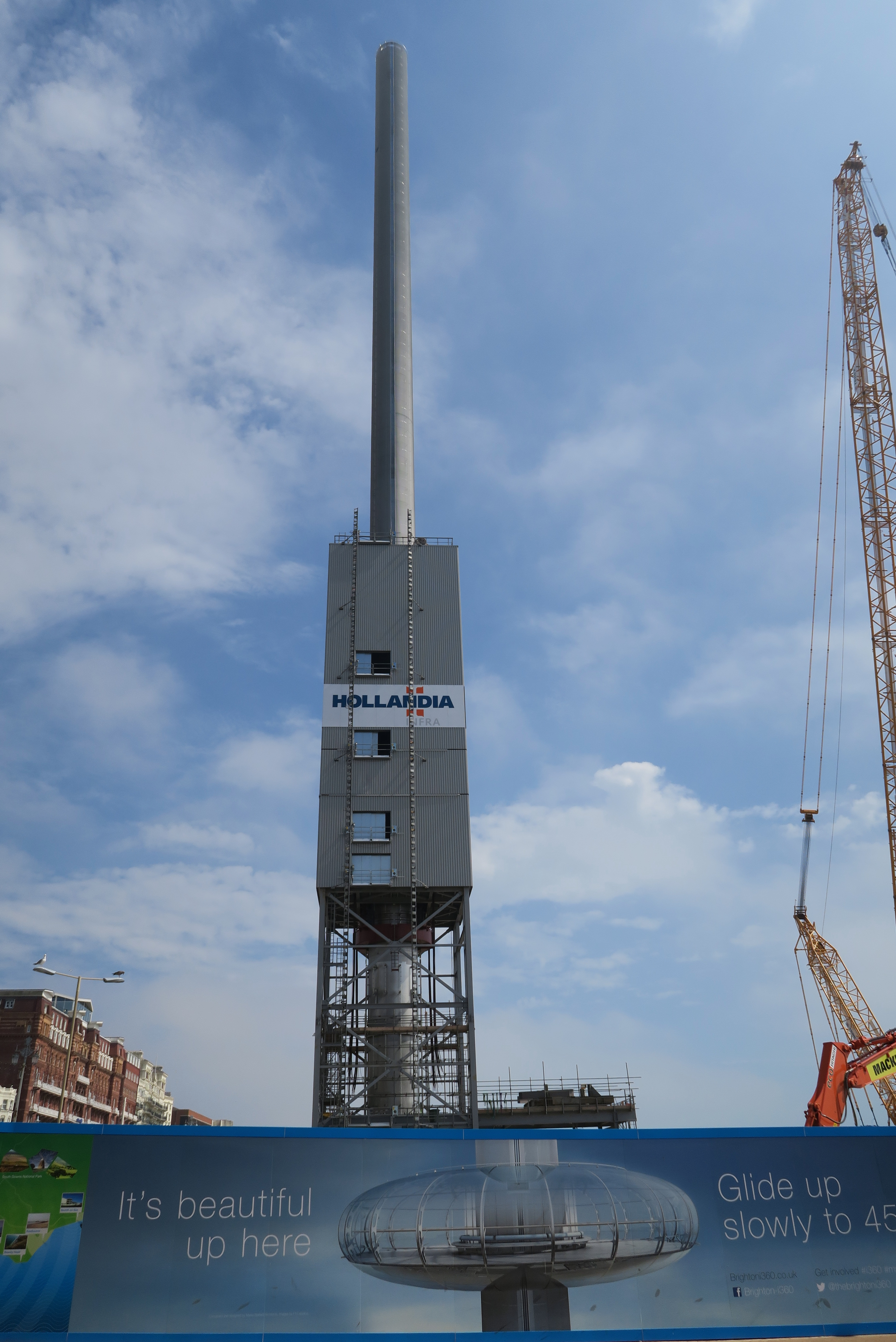
i360 under construction in August 2015

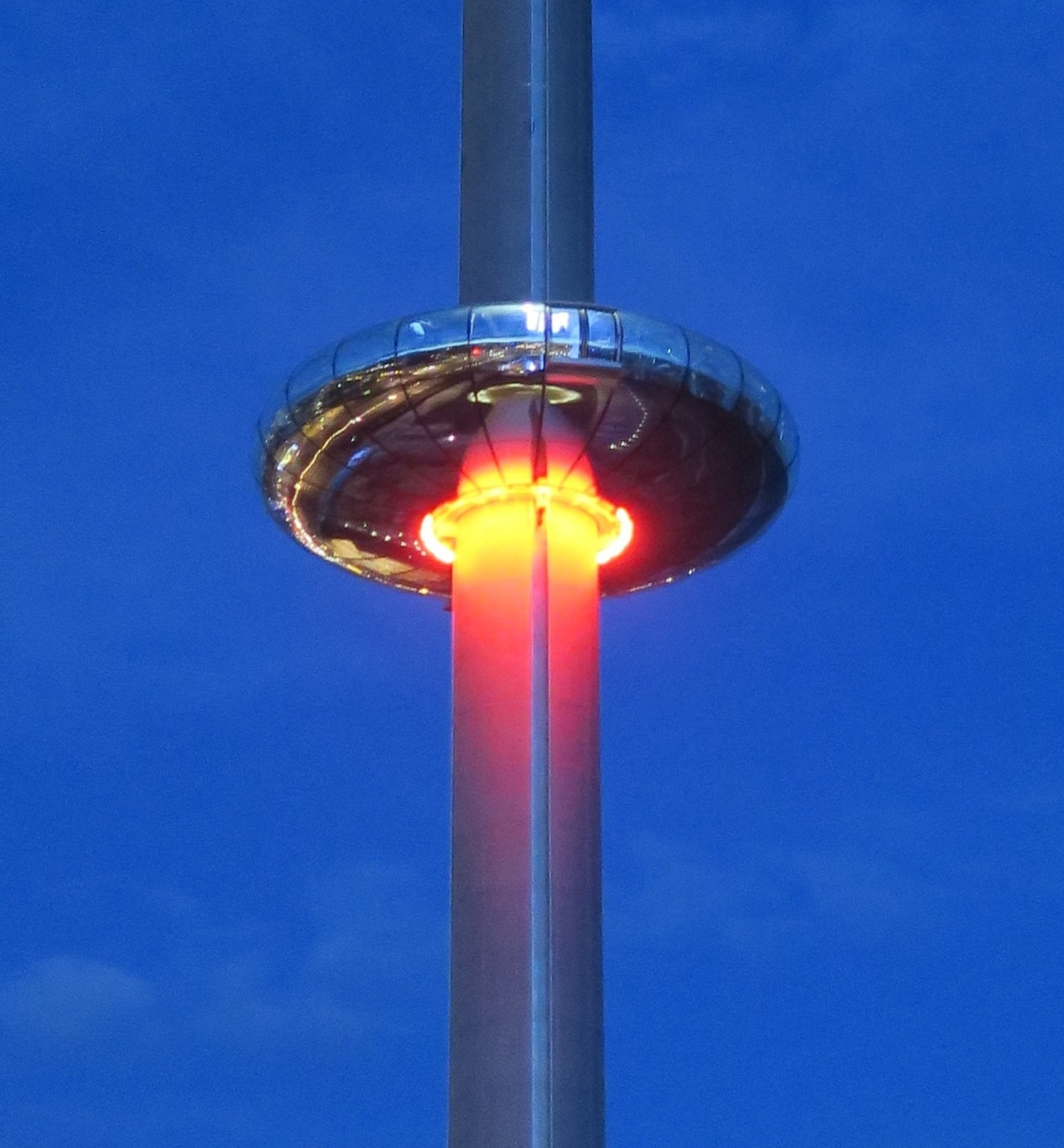
i360 on its first night of operation
