= Heron Academy =

Coordinates: 51.4616°N 0.1009°W

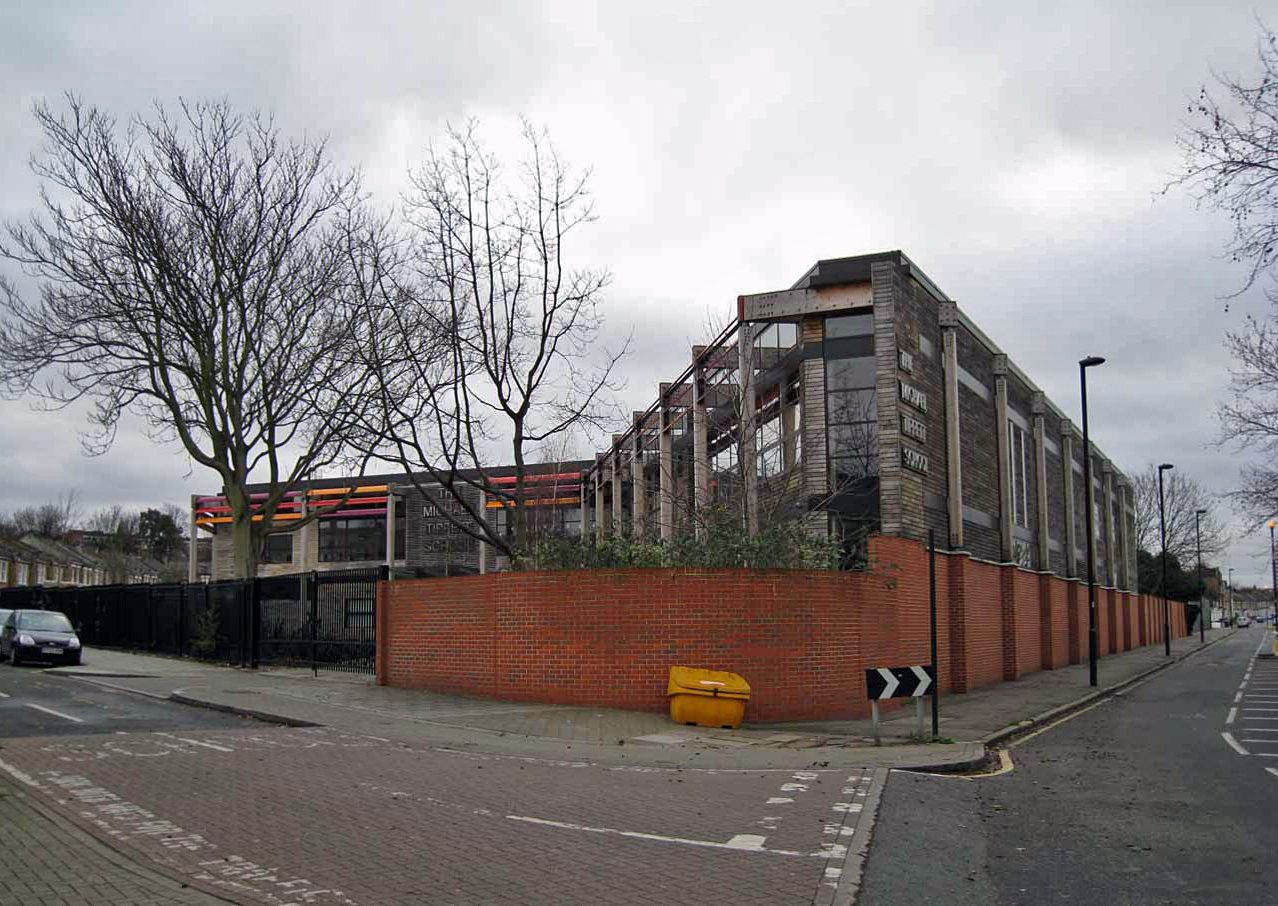

Location
- Heron Road; Herne Hill, London, SE24 0HZ; England

Information
- Type: Special school Academy
- Local authority: Lambeth
- Trust: London South East Academies Trust
- Department for Education URN: 149331 Tables
- Headteacher: Melanie Hall-Judd
- Gender: Coeducational
- Age: 11 to 19
- Enrolment: 80
- Website: http://tmts.me.uk

Heron Academy (formerly The Michael Tippett School) is a special needs secondary school for students with severe learning difficulties located in south London. It was previously named after the composer Michael Tippett. The building was designed by Marks Barfield Architect and completed in 2008. It can accommodate 80 students between the age of 11 and 19.

It was built as part of the Building Schools for the Future programme and was the first school in London and the first special education school in the country to be completed under the programme.

Previously a community school administered by Lambeth London Borough Council, In February 2023 The Michael Tippett School converted to academy status and was renamed Heron Academy. The school is now sponsored by the London South East Academies Trust.
