= David Marks (architect) =

British architect (1952–2017)

David Marks MBE
- Born: David Joseph Marks; 15 December 1952; Stockholm, Sweden
- Died: 6 October 2017 (aged 64)
- Occupation: Architect
- Known for: London Eye; British Airways i360
- Spouse: Julia Barfield
- Children: 3

David Joseph Marks MBE (15 December 1952 – 6 October 2017) was a British architect. In partnership with his wife Julia Barfield, he designed the London Eye, the British Airways i360 observation tower in Brighton, and the Treetop Walkway at Kew Gardens, London.

David Marks was born on 15 December 1952 in Stockholm, Sweden, the son of Gunilla (née Lovén) and Melville Marks, a journalist and film producer. Marks, who was Jewish, grew up in Geneva, where he attended the International School of Geneva. He moved to London in 1972, at first to study at the Kingston Polytechnic before moving to Architectural Association School of Architecture.

Marks was married to fellow architect Julia Barfield and they formed the architecture firm Marks Barfield.

He was appointed Member of the Order of the British Empire (MBE) in the 2000 New Year Honours "for services to the British Airways London Eye."

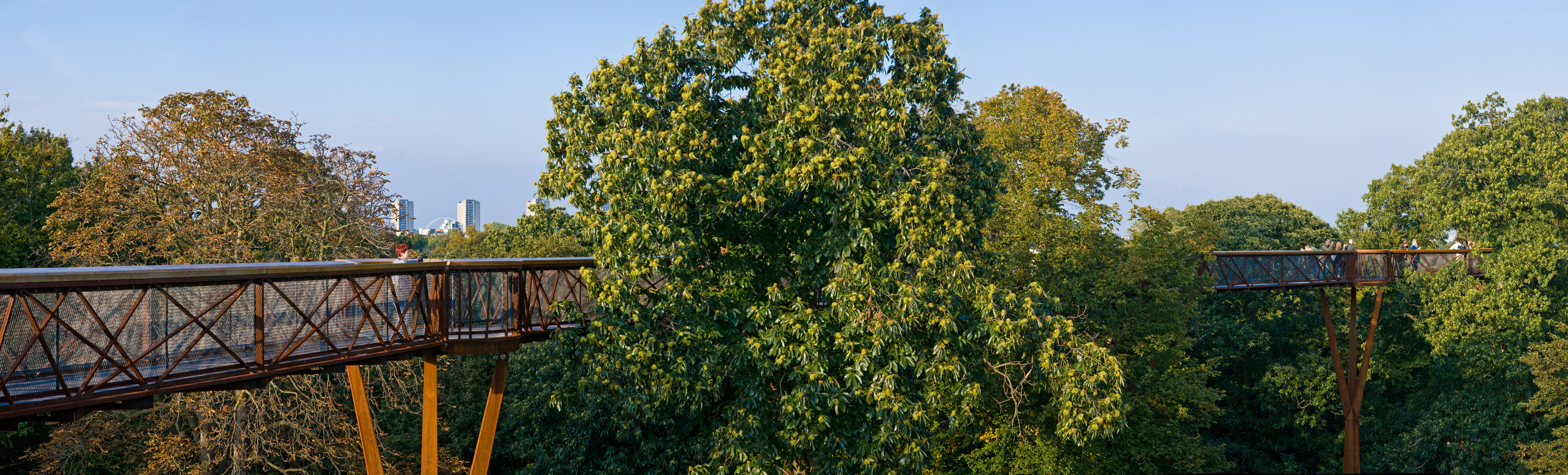
A panoramic view of the treetop walkway, which stands 18 metres (59 ft) above ground
