= Cambridge Central Mosque =

Mosque in Cambridge, United Kingdom

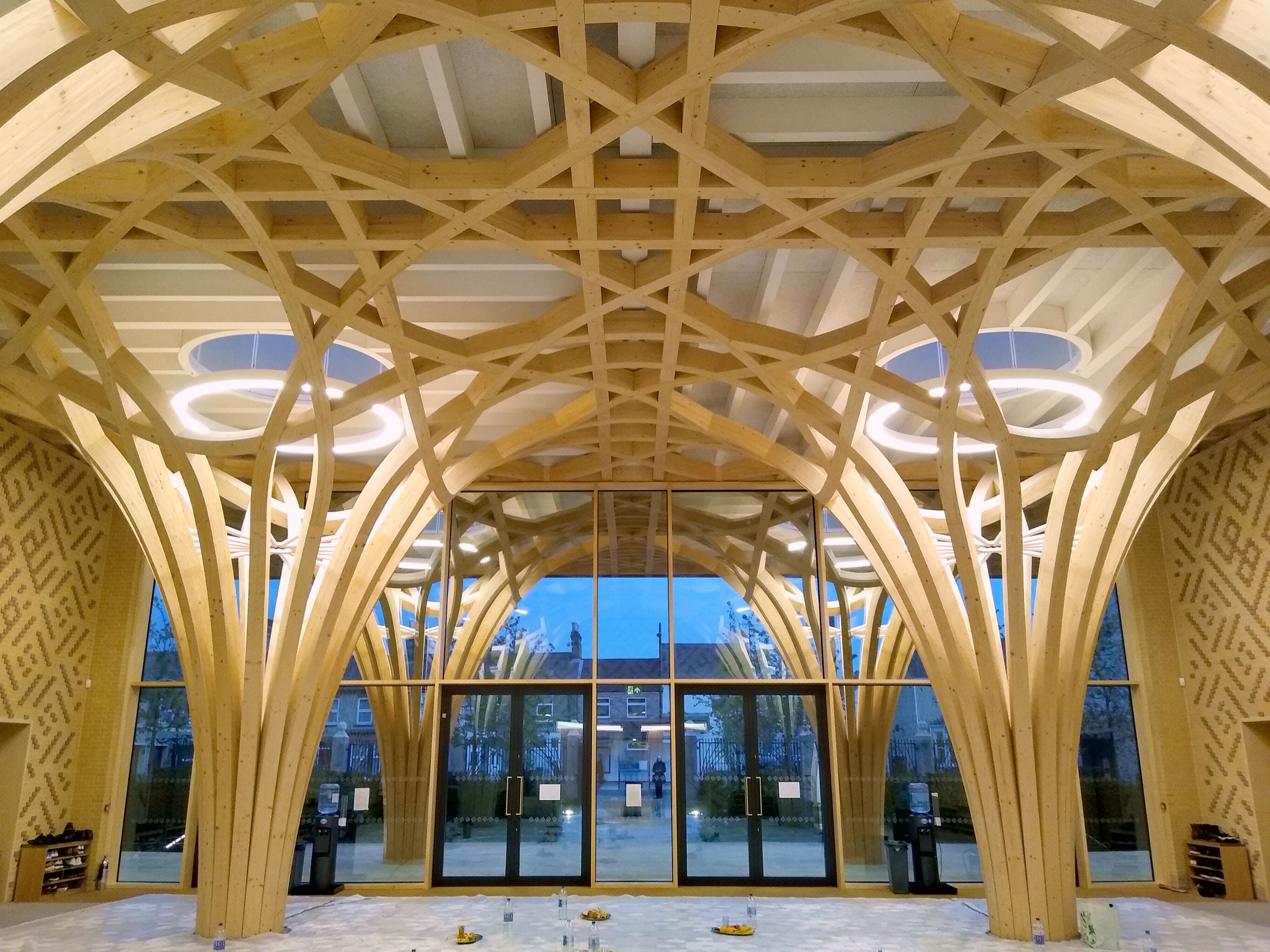
- Cambridge Central Mosque atrium, facing Mill Road

Religion
- Affiliation: Islam
- Region: Romsey, Mill Road
- Status: Active

Location
- Location: Cambridge, United Kingdom
- Interactive map of Cambridge Central Mosque
- Coordinates: 52.197°N 0.152°E

Architecture
- Architect: Marks Barfield
- Type: Mosque
- Style: Eco-technology design
- Completed: Q1 2019
- Construction cost: £23 million

Specifications
- Capacity: 1,000
- Dome: 1
- Minaret: 0
- Materials: Timber, bricks and tiles

Website
- https://www.cambridgecentralmosque.org/

The Cambridge Central Mosque is the first purpose-built mosque within the city of Cambridge, England. It opened to the public on 24 April 2019. The Mosque is a prominent Islamic centre located on Mill Road in the Romsey area of Cambridge. The mosque serves as a place of worship, community centre and cultural hub for Muslims in the area. It hosts a variety of events, including religious services, lectures, workshops, and cultural celebrations.

== Planning and construction ==
Plan for a new mosque began in 2007 when the existing Mawson Road mosque began to experience capacity issues, and the project was initiated to address the growing needs of the Muslim community in Cambridge, providing them with a dedicated space for worship, community activities, and cultural events. The Muslim Academic Trust (MAT) proposed the site location to be situated in the Romsey area of Mill Road in Cambridge. Thereafter, the Cambridge Mosque Project was established in 2008 by Dr Timothy Winter, a lecturer in Islamic studies at the University of Cambridge, to raise funds for the project.

After the £4m purchase of a one-acre site in 2009 on Mill Road. A design competition was held in 2009, which was won by Marks Barfield Architects, the firm behind the London Eye. Marks Barfield designed the new mosque in association with Professor Keith Critchlow, an expert in sacred architecture and Islamic geometry along with Islamic garden designer Emma Clark. Plans for the mosque were submitted to the Cambridge City Council by the MAT and it was approved by the council in 2012. The project however was controversial and it was met with objections.

Donors from Europe, the Middle East, Asia and the Americas have supported the project, but most of the donations, around two-thirds of the total, came from Turkey. Construction started in September 2016, and the building was completed in March 2019. The mosque opened to the public on 24 April 2019.

== Architecture and design ==
The mosque's architecture is inspired by both Islamic and English religious architectural traditions. It incorporates elements of Islamic geometry and symbolism. It is a one-story building located on a rectangular site which is predominantly the residential area of Cambridge. Visitors pass through a formal garden with trees and a water feature facing Mill Road before entering the building. The entrance canopy is supported by four tree-shaped wooden columns; each of these columns has a skylight that allows natural light inside the mosque.

The building is characterised by its timber structure with glulam columns that resembles a forest canopy, symbolising a garden as a place of contemplation and paradise in Islamic tradition. The mosque's layout emphasises natural light and ventilation, with large glazed oculi allowing sunlight to pour into the prayer hall.

The mosque incorporates various green technologies, including natural lighting, ventilation systems, air source heat pumps, photovoltaic arrays, and rainwater harvesting. These features contribute to the mosque's minimal carbon footprint and environmental responsibility.

== Recognition and awards ==
Since its completion, the Cambridge Central Mosque has received recognition and awards for its architecture and design. It won plaudits for its innovative approach to mosque architecture and its positive impact on the community. The design and architecture of the Cambridge Central Mosque has gained many rewards including RIBA East Project Architect of the year and Building of the year, and RIBA Client of the year in 2021.

== Gallery ==
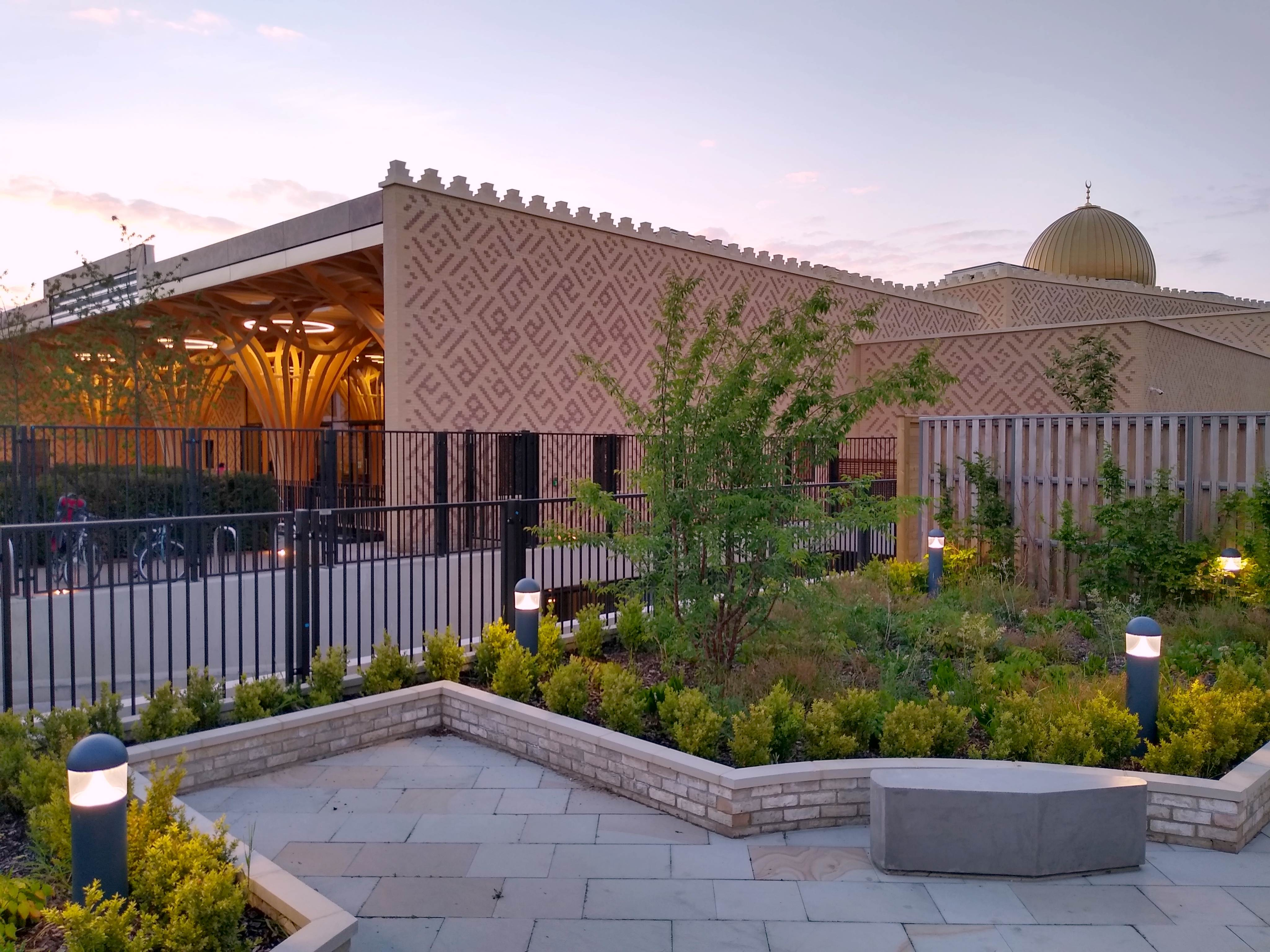
View from Mill Road

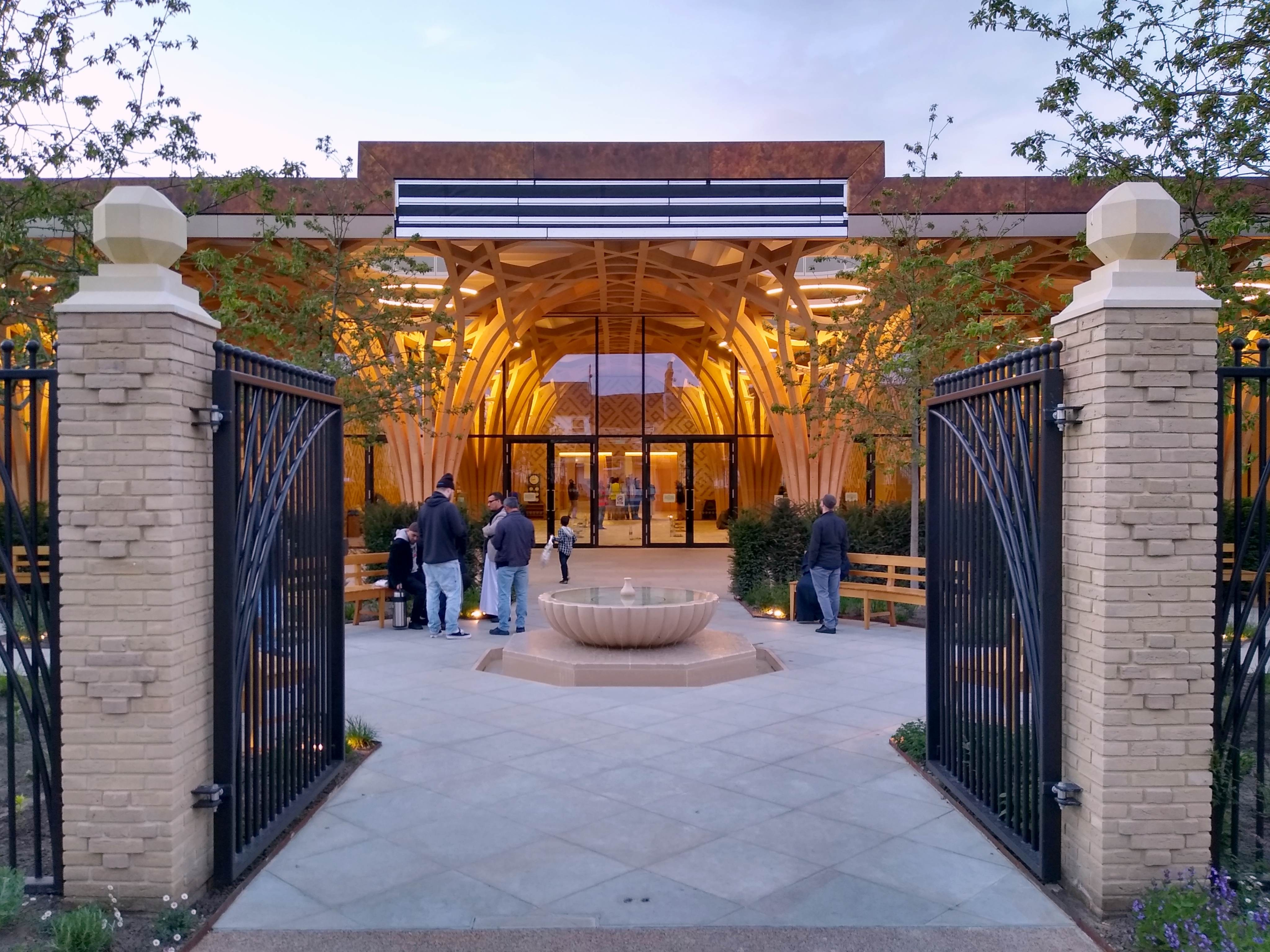
Gate and garden

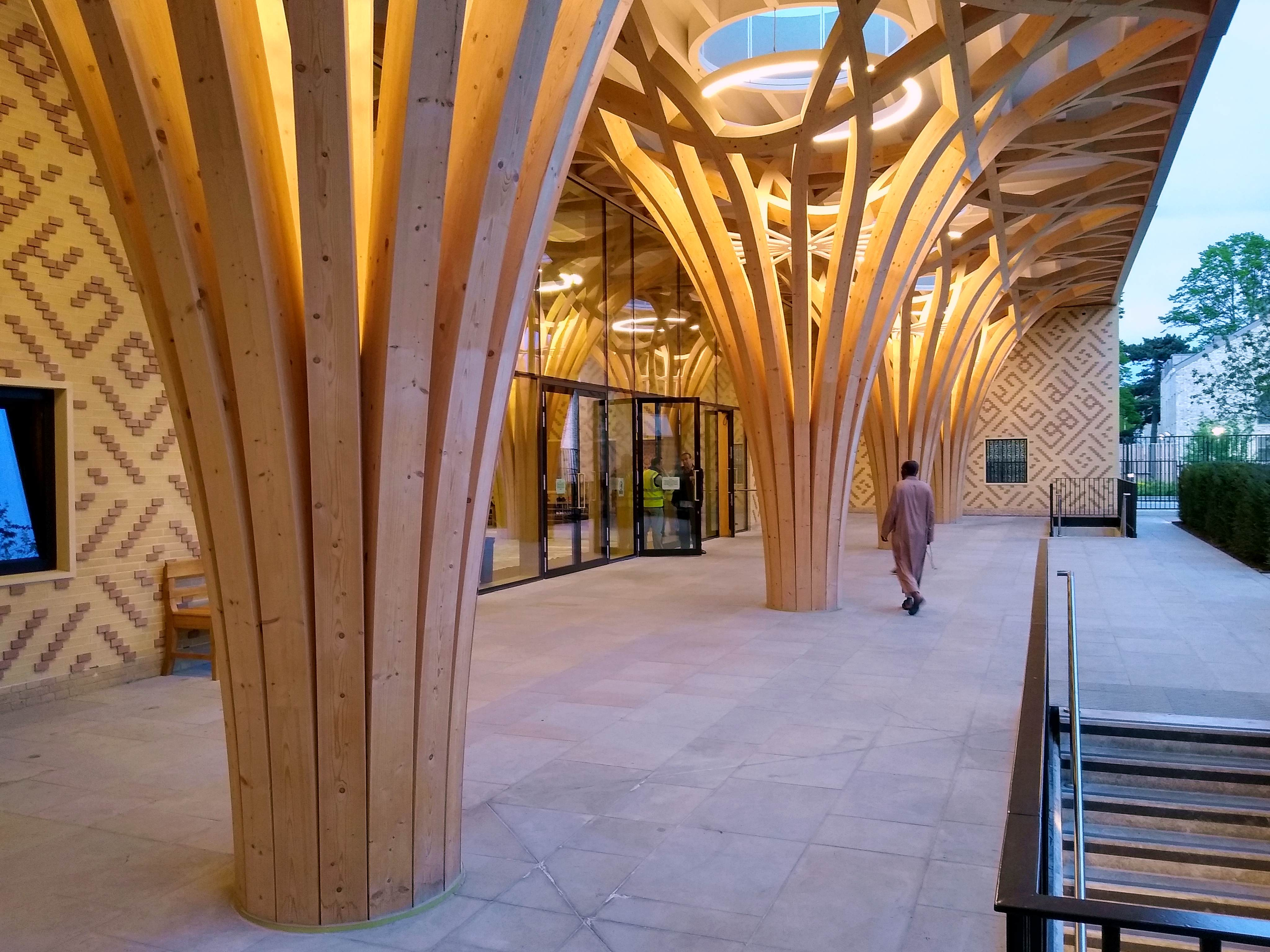
Portico

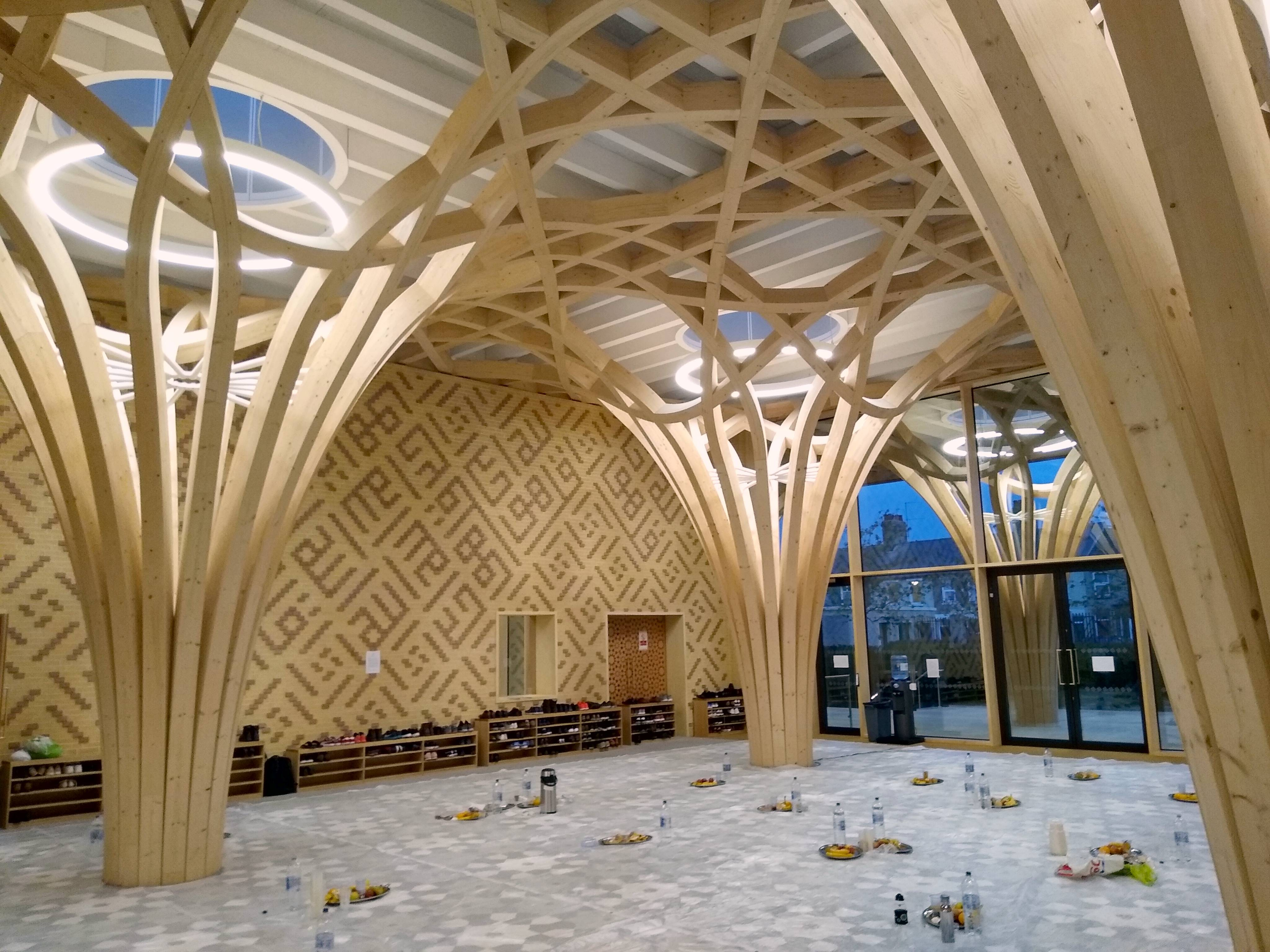
Atrium

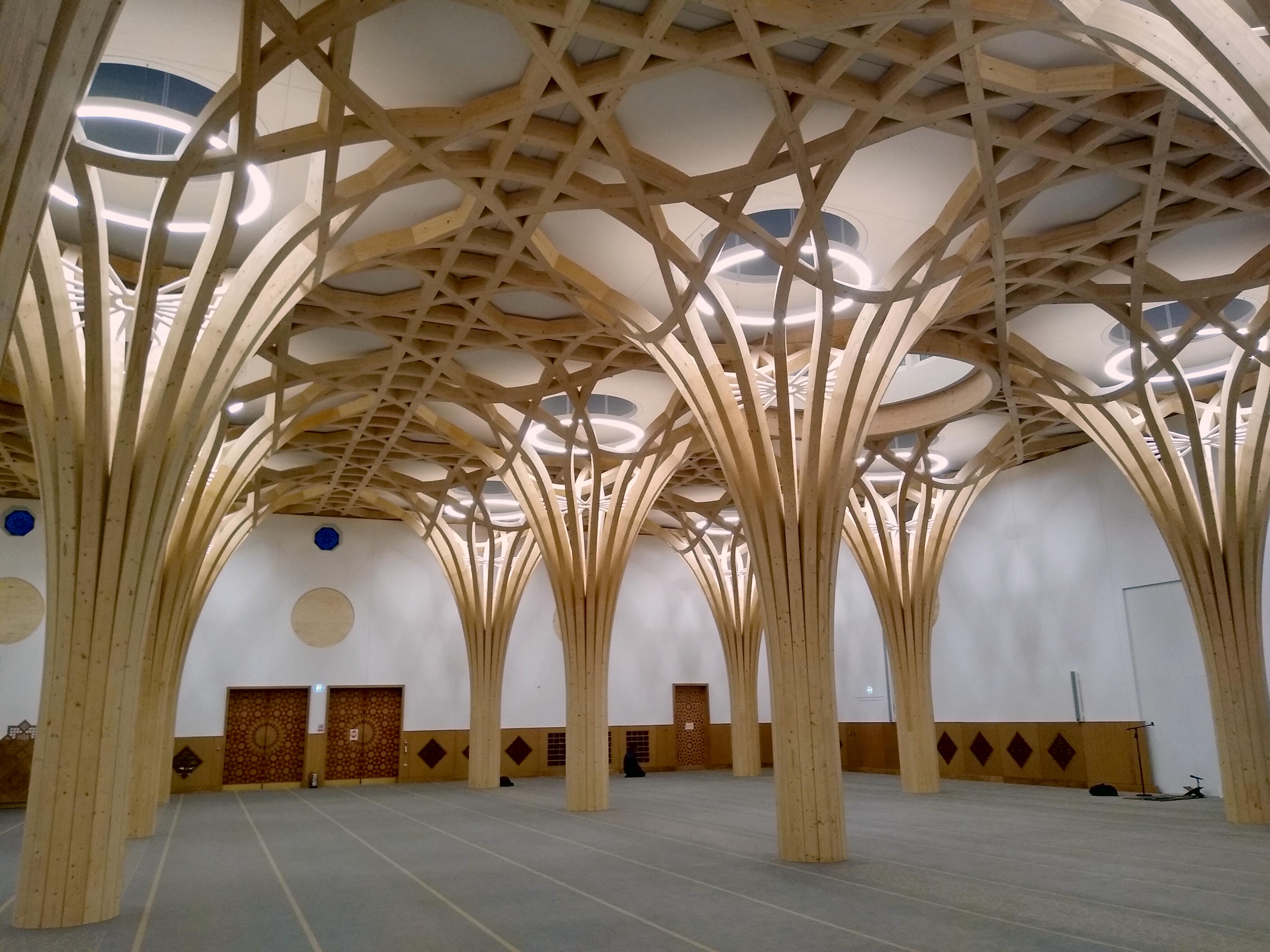
Prayer hall

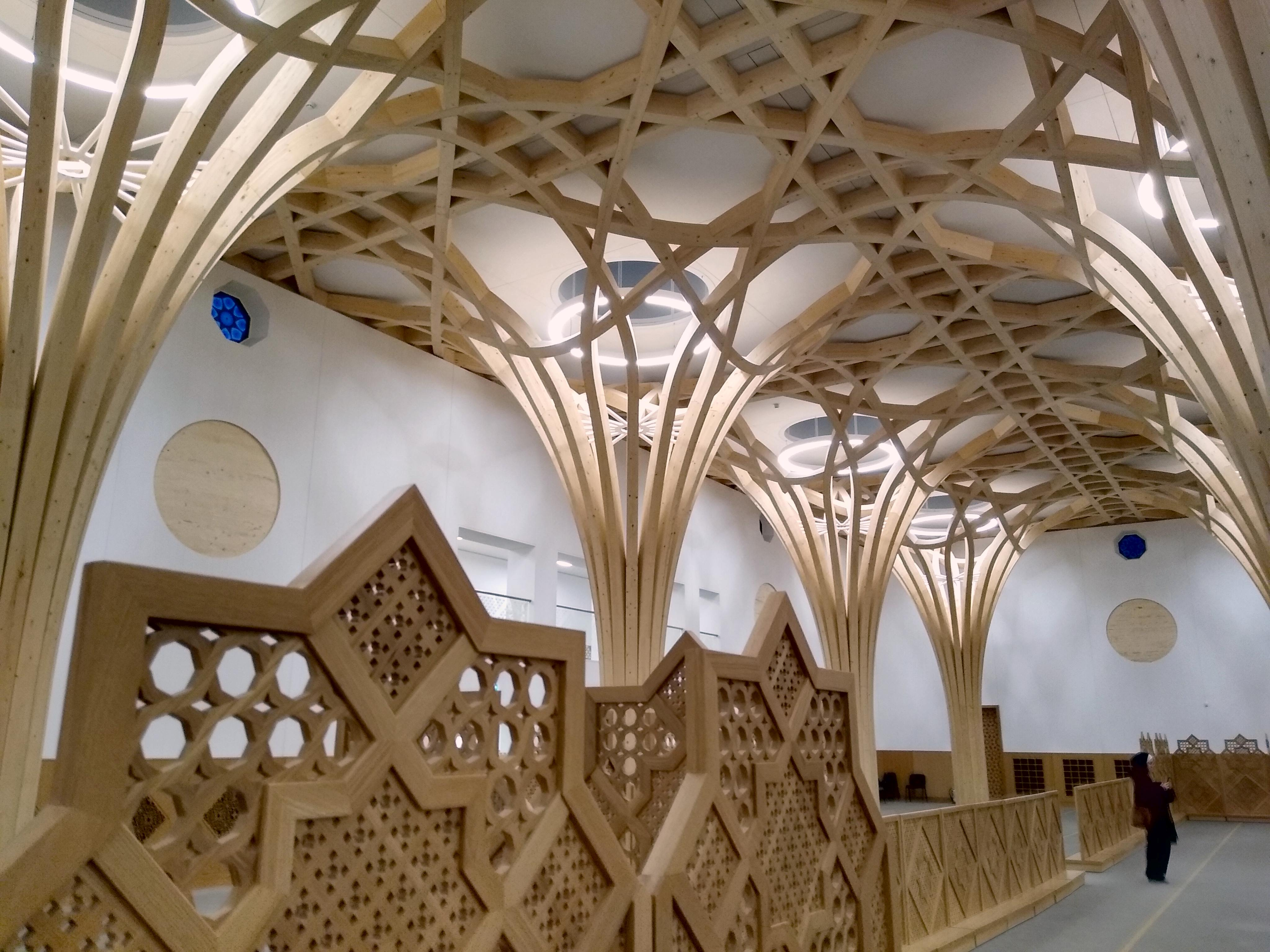
Prayer hall screen

== See also ==
- Cambridge Muslim College
