= Jane Wernick =

British construction engineer (born 1954)

Jane Melville Wernick
- Born: April 1954 (age 71–72)
- Education: University of Southampton
- Occupation: Civil engineer

Jane Melville Wernick CBE FREng (born April 1954) is a British structural engineer and a consultant to engineersHRW. Having founded Jane Wernick Associates in 1998, she gave the firm to an employee trust in 2010 and it was incorporated into engineersHRW in May 2015. Previously, she worked at Arup (1976–1998). During her career with Arup, and later with Jane Wernick Associates, she was closely involved with projects including Stansted Airport terminal building and the London Eye.

== Early life and interests ==
Wernick was born in 1954, the eldest child of Irving and Doreen Wernick, and has lived in Hampstead, London. She attended Haberdashers' Aske's School for Girls in Acton and graduated from the University of Southampton in 1976.

== Career ==
From 1976 to 1998, Wernick worked for Ove Arup & Partners. She was in charge of Arup's Los Angeles office from 1986 to 1988. Wernick was the RAEng Visiting Professor of Design at Southampton University and has taught at the Harvard Graduate School of Design, the Mackintosh School of Architecture, Glasgow, and the Architectural Association, London. Wernick has been a member of the EDGE think tank and the RIBA Building Futures Steering Committee, in addition to a member of the Design Council CABE Design Review Panel and has been the Chair of the Diversity Task Force of the Construction Industry Council.

From 1996 to 1999 Wernick was a member of the Council of the Institution of Structural Engineers. She was also on the CABE Design Review Panel from 2001 to 2006 and the CABE Schools Panel from 2007 to 2011.

In 2016, Wernick and her work were featured in the V&A's Engineering Season.

== Notable projects ==
- 1986: Cerritos Centre for the Performing Arts, Los Angeles
- 1990–1993: Lille TGV station
- 1990–1998: London Eye
- 2004–2006: Young Vic, London
- 2005: Tickle Cock Bridge, Castleford
- 2010–2011 Living Architecture houses, including the Balancing Barn, near Aldeburgh, Suffolk; the Shingle House, Dungeness, Kent; the Long House, Cockthorpe, Norfolk and the Dune House, Thorpeness, Suffolk

== Awards ==
- 1988: First prize in the Institution of Civil Engineers (ICE) Bridge Competition
- 2006: Honorary Fellow of the Royal Institute of British Architects
- 2009: Fellow of the Royal Academy of Engineering
- 2013: First Woman of the Built Environment
- 2015 New Year Honours: Commander of the Order of the British Empire (CBE) – For services to Structural and Civil Engineering
