= Marks Barfield =

British architecture firm

Marks Barfield Ltd
- Type: Private
- Industry: Architectural firm
- Founded: 1989; 37 years ago
- Founders: David Marks; Julia Barfield
- Headquarters: London, England
- Owner: Julia Barfield; Estate of David Marks
- Website: marksbarfield.com

Marks Barfield Architects is a London-based architectural firm founded by husband and wife David Marks and Julia Barfield. Their work includes the London Eye, the treetop walkway in Kew Gardens, the i360 observation tower in Brighton, England and Cambridge Central Mosque.

== Works ==
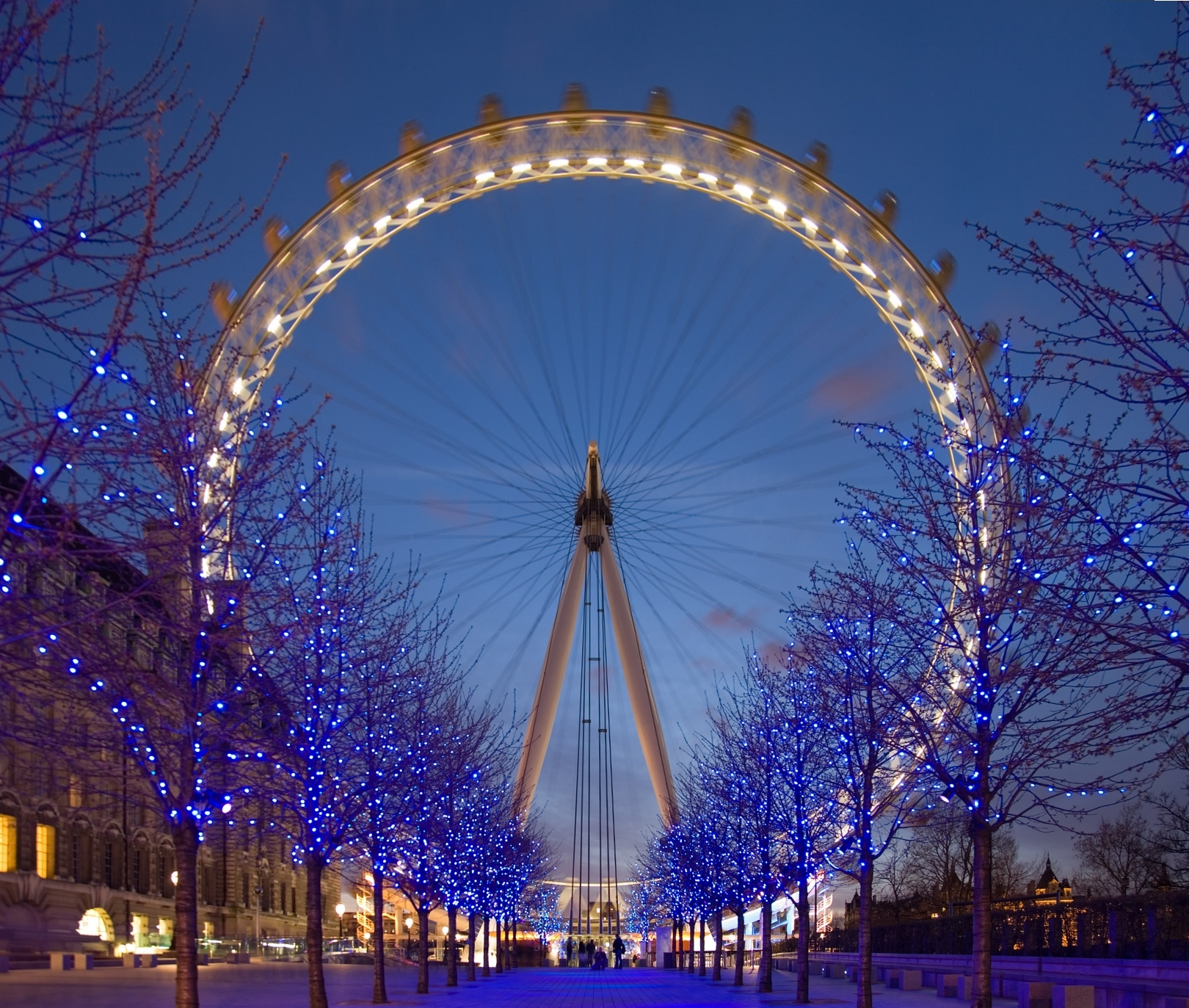
London Eye

- Liverpool Watersports Centre (1994)
- Waterloo Millenium Pier (1999)
- London Eye (2000)
- Stoke Newington Watersports Centre (2002)
- Millbank Millennium Pier (2004)
- Spiral Café, Birmingham (2004)
- The Lightbox, Woking (2007)
- The Michael Tippett School (2008)
- Treetop Walkway at Kew Gardens (2008)
- Wembley White Horse Bridge & Public Realm (2008)
- Think Tank, Lincoln (2008)
- ITCC, Riyadh (2012)
- Greenwich Gateway Pavilions (2015)
- University of Cambridge Primary School (2015)
- i360, Brighton (2016)
- Cambridge Central Mosque (2019)
- The Lantern (2023)

Proposed project

- Amazon Science Centre, including a six-mile rainforest canopy walkway (2012)
- West Somerset Tidal Lagoon power station (2025)
