= London Eye =

Observation wheel in London, England

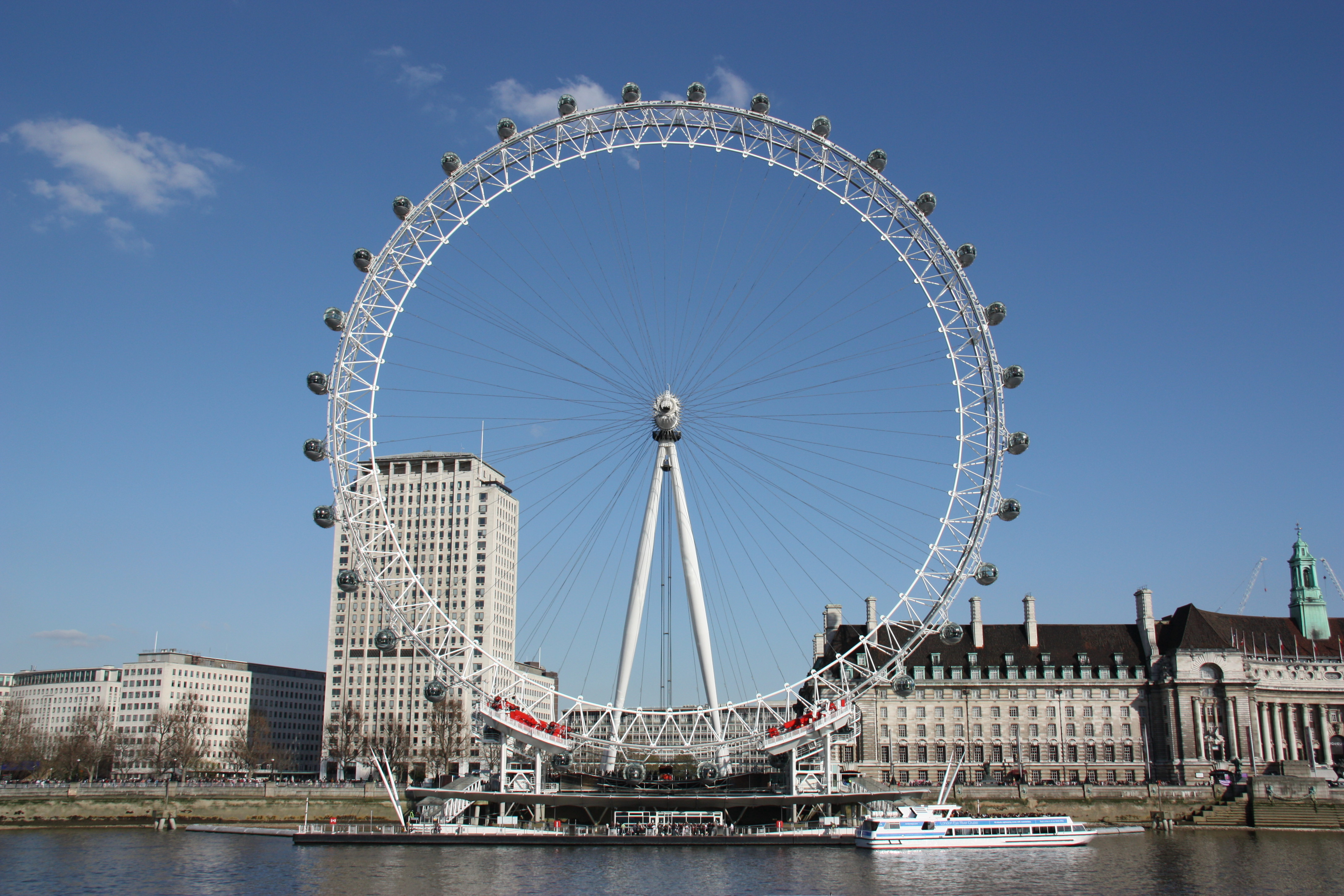
- The London Eye in 2009
- Interactive map of the London Eye area
- Former names: Millennium Wheel

General information
- Status: Operating
- Type: Observation wheel
- Location: Lambeth, London, Riverside Building, County Hall, Westminster Bridge Road
- Coordinates: 51.5033°N 0.1194°W
- Completed: March 2000
- Opened: 31 December 1999 (ceremonial, without passengers); 1 February 2000 (first passengers carried); 9 March 2000 (opened to general public)
- Cost: £70 million
- Owner: Merlin Entertainments

Height
- Height: 135 metres (443 ft)

Dimensions
- Diameter: 120 metres (394 ft)

Design and construction
- Architects: David Marks; Julia Barfield; Frank Anatole; Joanna Bailey; Nic Bailey; Margarita Bowman; Loren Butt; Steve Chilton; Malcom Cook; Mark Sparrowhawk
- Architecture firm: Marks Barfield
- Structural engineer: Arup
- Other designers: Babtie Allott & Lomax (checking engineer); Tony Gee (foundations)
- Awards: Institution of Structural Engineers Special Award 2001

Other information
- Public transit: Waterloo; Westminster

Website
- londoneye.com

The London Eye, originally the Millennium Wheel, is a cantilevered observation wheel on the South Bank of the River Thames in London. It is the world's tallest cantilevered observation wheel, and the most popular paid tourist attraction in the United Kingdom with more than three million visitors annually. It has been featured numerous times in popular culture.

The structure is 135 metres (443 ft) tall and the wheel has a diameter of 120 metres (394 ft). When it opened to the public in 2000 it was the world's tallest Ferris wheel, until the 160-metre (525 ft) Star of Nanchang in China surpassed it in 2006. Unlike taller wheels, the Eye is cantilevered and supported solely by an A-frame on one side. The Eye was the highest public viewing point in London until 2013, when it was surpassed by the 245-metre (804 ft) View from The Shard observation deck.

The London Eye adjoins the western end of Jubilee Gardens (previously the site of the former Dome of Discovery), on the South Bank of the River Thames between Westminster Bridge and Hungerford Bridge beside County Hall, in the London Borough of Lambeth. The nearest tube station is Waterloo.

== History ==
=== Conception ===
The London Eye was conceived by architects David Marks and Julia Barfield, a husband-and-wife team who met in 1972 while studying at the Architectural Association and living in squats in Stockwell, south London. After graduating, Barfield joined Norman Foster, contributing to projects such as the Royal Academy’s Sackler Galleries and Stansted Airport, while Marks worked for Richard Rogers on the Lloyd’s Building and the Inmos microprocessor factory. Both firms were leading exponents of high-tech architecture, noted for their innovative structural engineering and use of modern materials. The couple founded their own practice, Marks Barfield Architects, in 1989 following the birth of their first child, seeking a better work–life balance.

During the early 1990s recession, the firm struggled and took on small commissions such as kitchen extensions and brochure design. In 1993, Marks and Barfield entered a competition organised by The Sunday Times and the Architecture Foundation to design a landmark to commemorate the beginning of the third millennium. As entries were to be published in the newspaper, they saw it as a valuable opportunity for publicity.

Inspired by views of the BT Tower and the Crystal Palace transmitter on his daily commute, Marks conceived the idea of giving the public access to elevated views of London. The pair realised that a wheel could “get people up high easily, efficiently and effortlessly” while avoiding comparisons with the Eiffel Tower. Barfield suggested the South Bank for its central location and historic significance as the site of the Festival of Britain fifty years earlier. Together with structural engineer Jane Wernick of Arup, with whom they had previously collaborated, they submitted a concept for a 500-foot (152 m) wheel on the banks of the River Thames.

The competition ultimately concluded without a winner, after the "disappointed" judges—Foster, Richard Burdett, Andrew Neil, Hugh Pearman, and Valerie Singleton—deemed none of the proposals sufficiently imaginative. "We were narked. We had a great idea and no one was going to see it,” Marks later recalled. Undeterred and encouraged by friends, the architects remortgaged their home and applied to Lambeth Council for outline planning permission.

In the summer of 1994, Evening Standard editor Stewart Steven and correspondent Mira Bar-Hillel launched a "Back The Wheel" campaign which attracted public support. In December that year, the project secured a major backer when Bob Ayling, chief executive of British Airways and a neighbour of Marks and Barfield, persuaded the airline to invest £600,000 in seed funding.

This investment enabled Marks Barfield to commission Arup to produce detailed engineering plans and to consult statutory bodies and local community groups. Planning permission for the Millennium Wheel was granted in 1996. After British banks declined to finance the project, funding was ultimately secured from the German bank Westdeutsche Landesbank and the Japanese conglomerate Sumitomo Corporation.

=== Design and construction ===
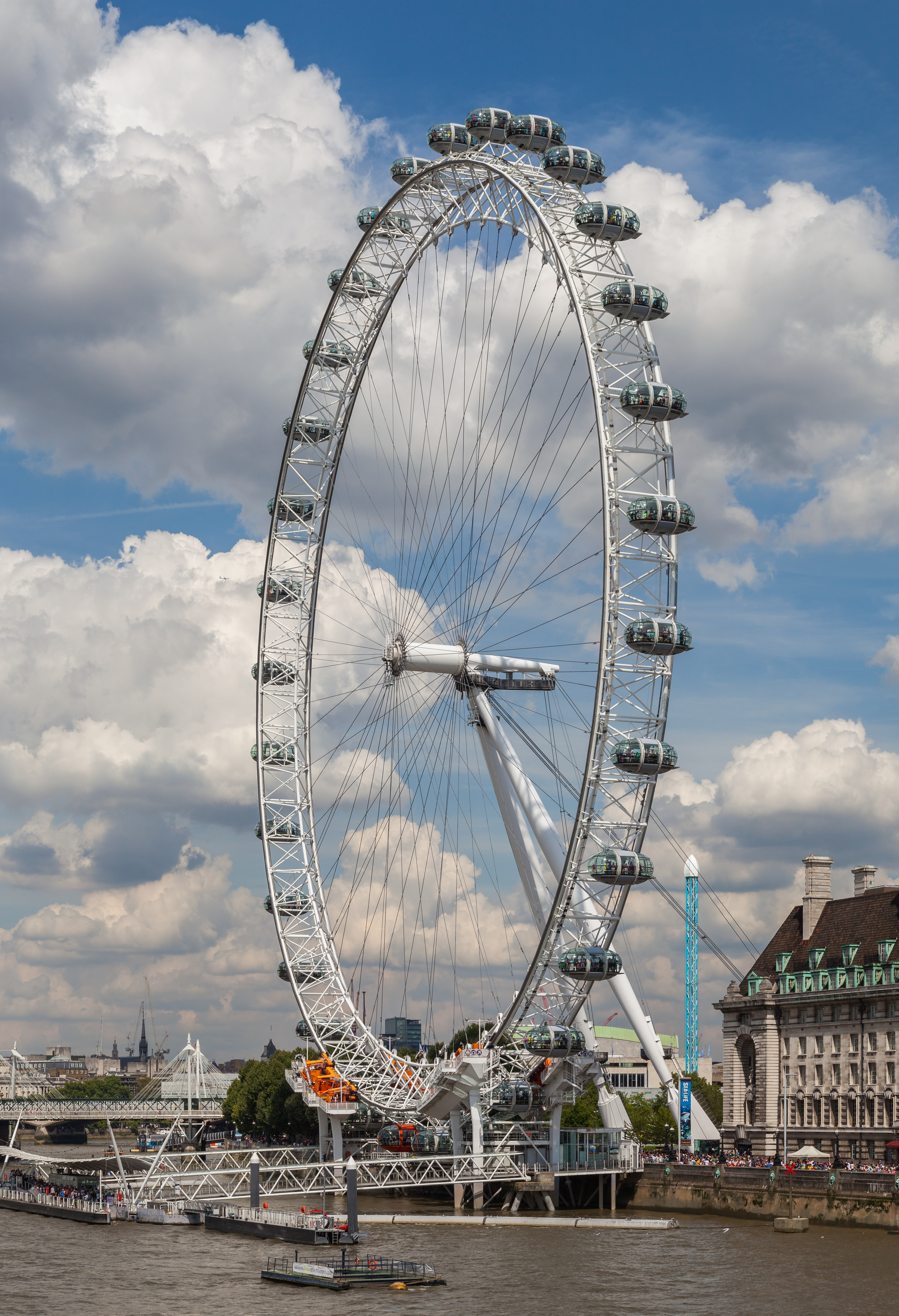
Supported by an A-frame on one side only, the Eye is described by its operators as a cantilevered observation wheel.

The rim of the Eye is supported by tensioned steel cables and resembles a huge spoked bicycle wheel. The lighting was re-done with LED lighting from Color Kinetics in December 2006 to allow digital control of the lights as opposed to the manual replacement of gels over fluorescent tubes.

Mace was responsible for construction management, with Hollandia as the main steelwork contractor and Tilbury Douglas as the civil contractor. Consulting engineers Tony Gee & Partners designed the foundation works while Beckett Rankine designed the marine works.

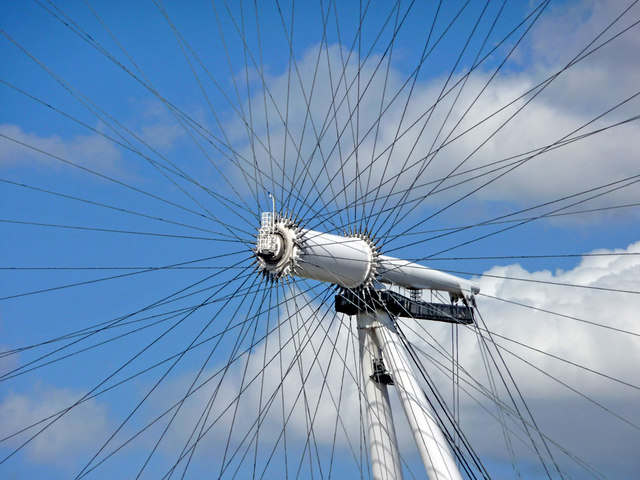
The spindle, hub, and tensioned cables that support the rim

The wheel was constructed in sections which were floated up the Thames on barges and assembled lying flat on piled platforms in the river. Once the wheel was complete it was lifted into an upright position by a strand jack system made by Enerpac. It was first raised at 2 degrees per hour until it reached 65 degrees, then left in that position for a week while engineers prepared for the second phase of the lift.

The project was European with major components coming from six countries: the steel was supplied from the UK and fabricated in the Netherlands by Hollandia, the cables came from Italy, the bearings came from Germany (FAG/Schaeffler Group), the spindle and hub were cast in the Czech Republic, the capsules were made by Poma in France (and the glass for these came from Italy), and the electrical components from the UK.

=== Opening ===
The London Eye was formally opened on 31 December 1999 by the Prime Minister, Tony Blair, who fired a laser beam across the Thames. The occasion was marked by a flypast from Concorde, British Airways' flagship jet.

However, it did not open to the paying public until 9 March 2000 because of a capsule clutch problem.

The London Eye was originally intended as a temporary attraction, with a five-year lease. In December 2001, operators submitted an application to Lambeth Council to give the London Eye permanent status, and the application was granted in July 2002.

=== Southbank Centre dispute ===
In May 2005, there were reports of a leaked letter showing that the Southbank Centre (SBC)—owners of part of the land on which the struts of the Eye are located—had served a notice to quit on the attraction along with a demand for an increase in rent from £65,000 per year to £2.5 million, which the operator rejected as unaffordable.

Mayor Ken Livingstone pledged that if the dispute was not resolved he would ask the London Development Agency to issue a compulsory purchase order. The land in question is a small part of the Jubilee Gardens, which was given to the SBC for £1 when the Greater London Council was broken up.

In February 2006, after a request for judicial review was refused, a new 25-year lease was agreed under which the SBC would receive a percentage of the London Eye's turnover, with a minimum of £500,000 per year.

=== Change of ownership ===
Architects Marks Barfield, the Tussauds Group, and British Airways were the original owners of the London Eye. Tussauds announced the acquisition of British Airways' share in 2005, then Marks Barfield's in 2006. The purchase gave Tussauds sole ownership and resolved debt owed to British Airways for construction costs, which stood at more than £175 million and had been charged at an interest rate of 25% per annum. Tussauds was later merged with Merlin Entertainments.

=== Continued operations ===
In 2009, a 4D cinema was added in nearby County Hall, where visitors watch a four-minute film before riding the London Eye. The film shows London landmarks through the eyes of a seagull, with synchronised physical effects such as wind, falling snow, and scents.

As of 2025, the attraction has carried more than 85 million passengers.

== Passenger capsules ==
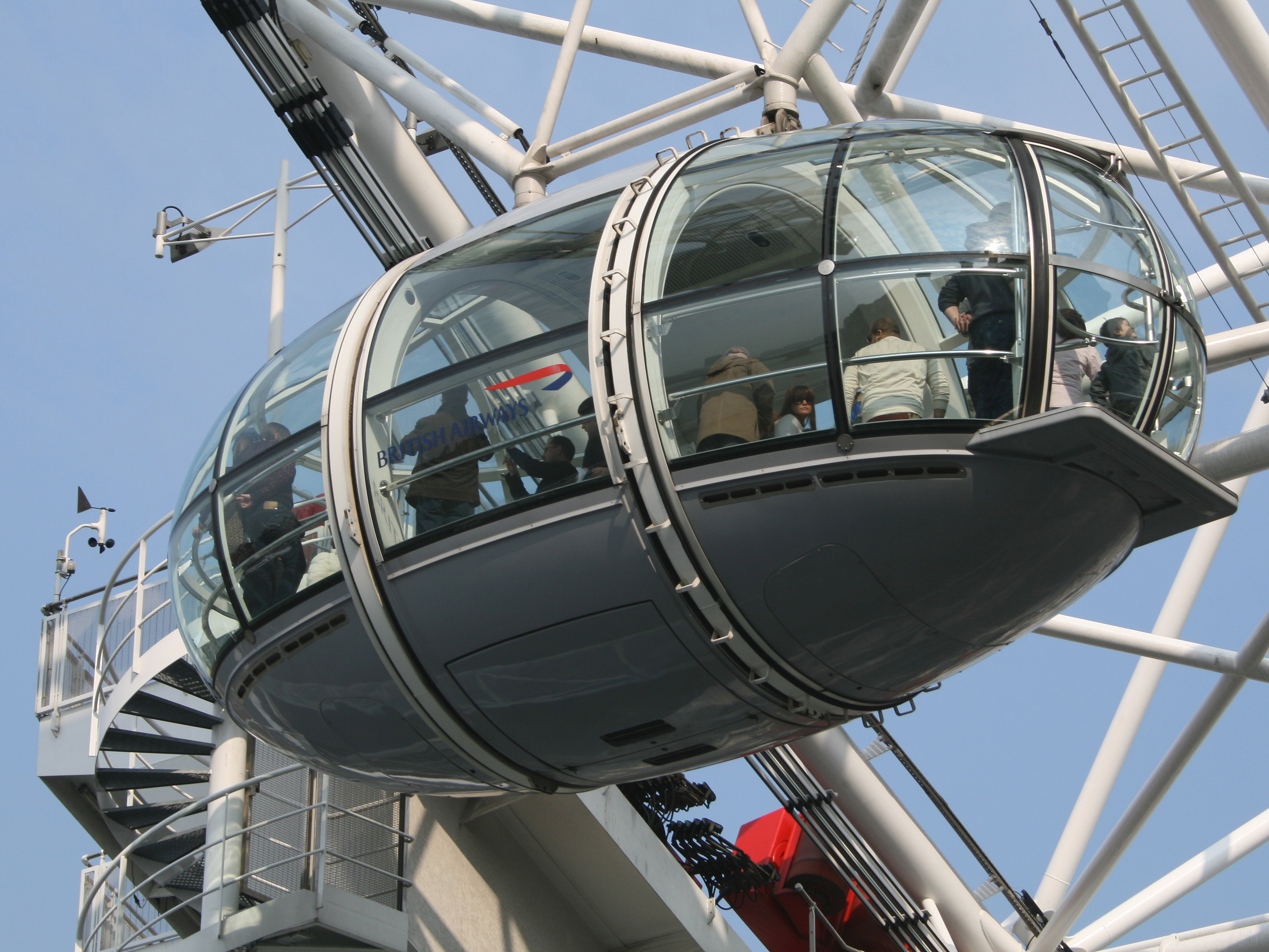
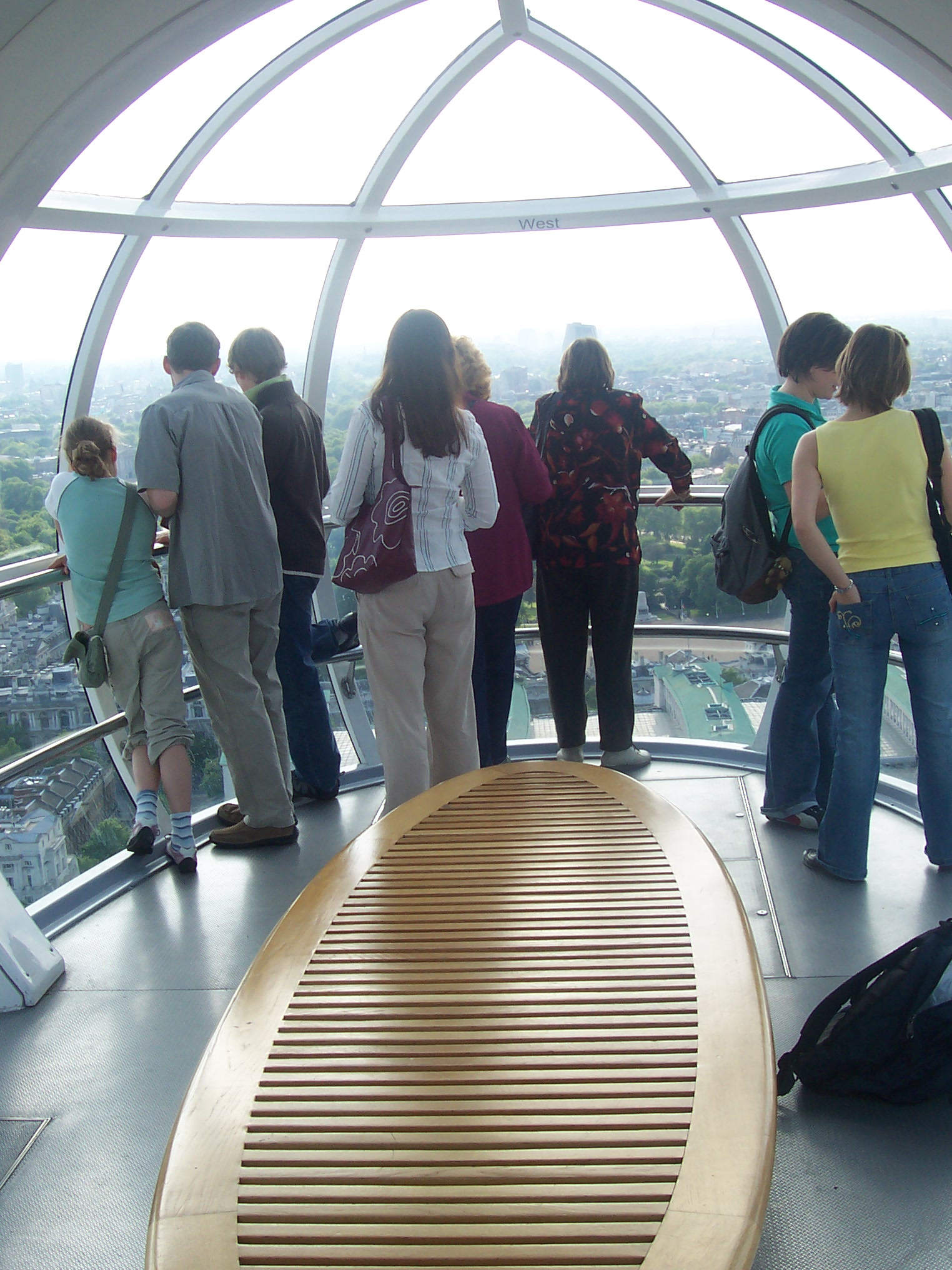
Each of the 32 ovoidal capsules weighs 10 tonnes and can carry 25 people.

The wheel's 32 sealed and air-conditioned ovoidal passenger capsules, designed and supplied by Poma, are attached to the external circumference of the wheel and rotated by electric motors. The capsules are numbered from 1 to 33, excluding number 13 for superstitious reasons. Each of the 10-tonne (11-short-ton) capsules represents one of the London boroughs, and holds up to 25 people, who are free to walk around inside the capsule, though seating is provided. The wheel rotates at 26 cm (10 in) per second (about 0.9 km/h or 0.6 mph) so that one revolution takes about 30 minutes, giving a theoretical capacity of 1,600 passengers per hour. It does not usually stop to take on passengers; the rotation rate is slow enough to allow passengers to walk on and off the moving capsules at ground level. It is stopped to allow disabled or elderly passengers time to embark and disembark safely.

In 2009, the first stage of a £12.5 million capsule upgrade began. Each capsule was taken down and floated down the river to Tilbury Docks in Essex.

On 2 June 2013, a passenger capsule was named the Coronation Capsule to mark the 60th anniversary of the coronation of Queen Elizabeth II.

In March 2020, the London Eye celebrated its 20th birthday by turning several of its capsules into experiences themed around London. The experiences included a pub in a capsule, a West End theatre capsule and a garden party with flower arrangements to represent the eight London Royal Parks.

== Sponsors ==
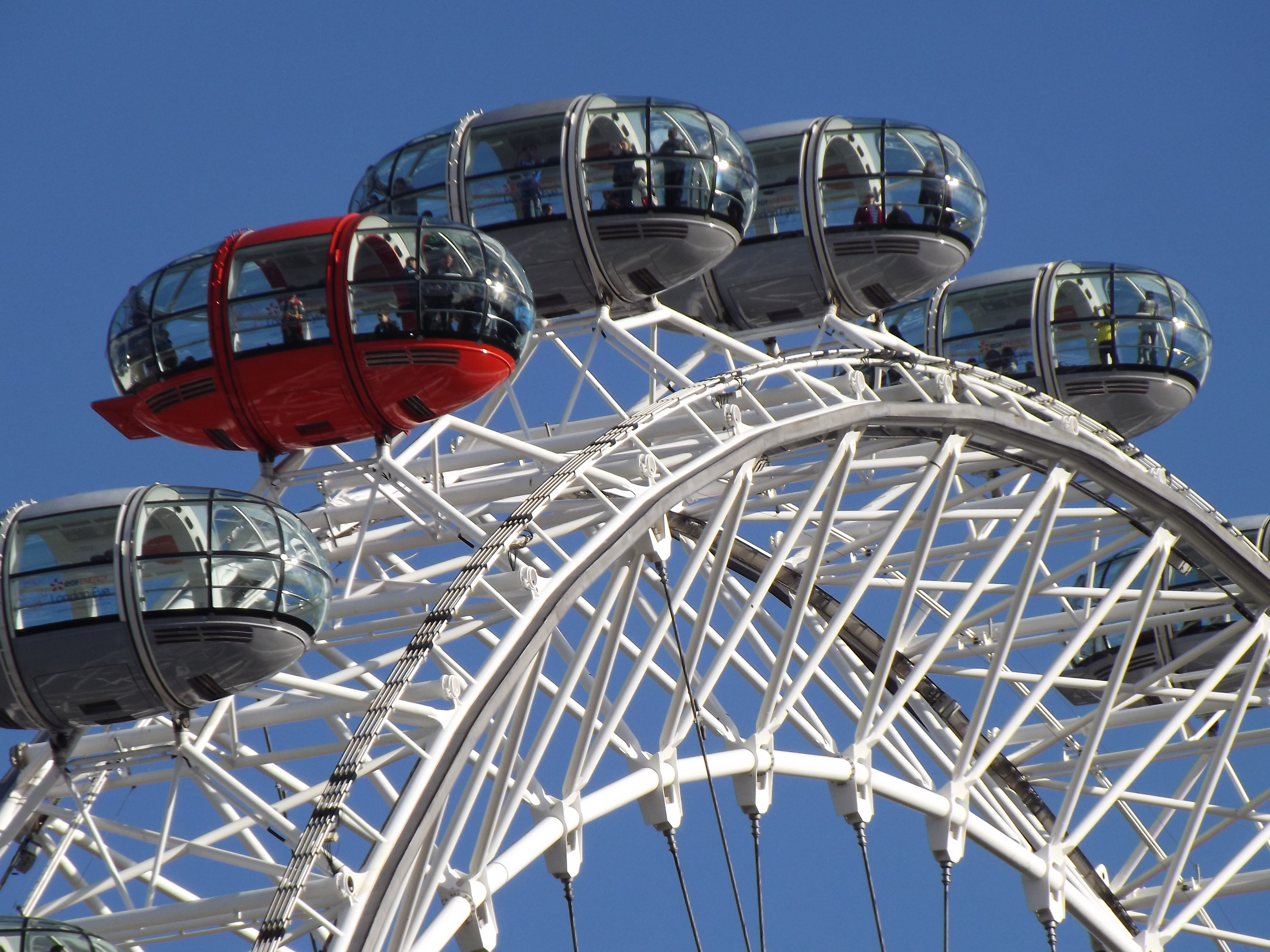
Local councillors refused permission for an orange capsule promoting the attraction's sponsor.

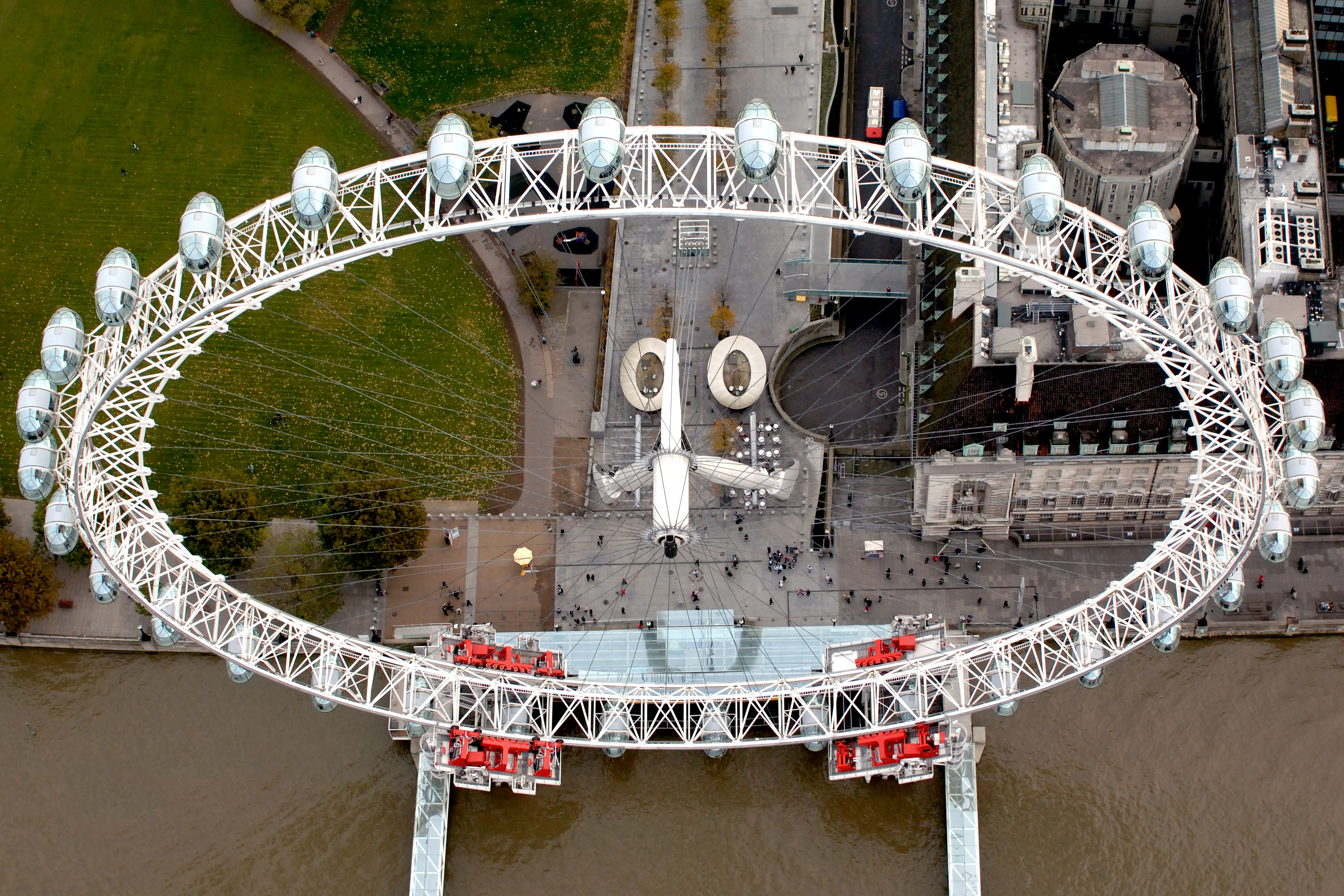
The Eye on the South Bank of the Thames, with Jubilee Gardens (left) and County Hall (right) in the background

From the time of opening until 2008, the attraction was known as the British Airways London Eye under a naming rights deal. In August 2009, it was rebranded as the Merlin Entertainments London Eye, reflecting the name of its operator.

EDF Energy became the sponsor in 2011, reportedly paying about £2.5 million a year. The deal coincided with its sponsorship of the London 2012 Olympic Games. A capsule was repainted bright orange to match the company's branding, but local councillors refused consent and requested it be restored to its original appearance.

In 2015, the attraction rebranded as the Coca-Cola London Eye, drawing criticism from children's health charities. Labour MP Keith Vaz urged the Government to intervene, condemning the "irresponsible" promotion of a high-sugar product "at a time of record child obesity, rotten teeth and diabetes."

In 2020, the online travel retailer lastminute.com became the new sponsor, with the wheel illuminated at night in the brand’s hot pink.

== Cultural significance ==
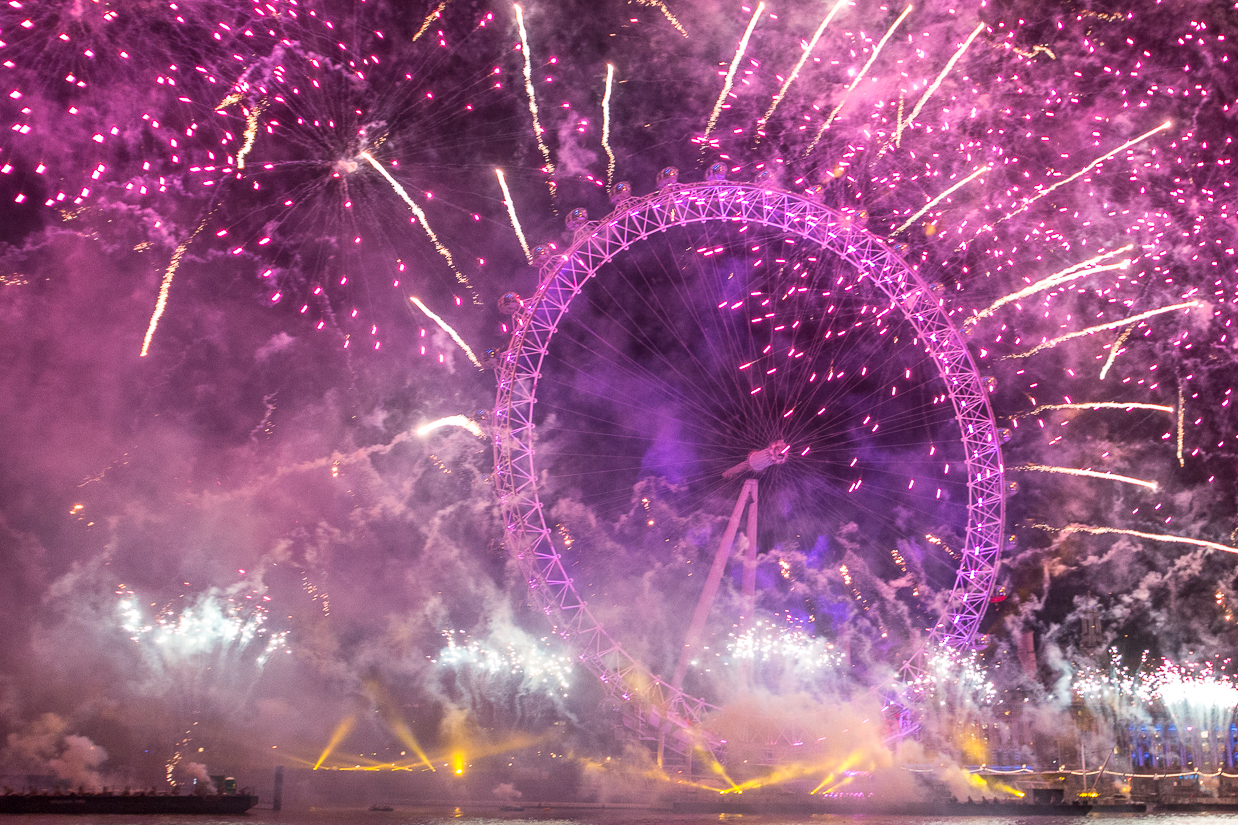
Thousands of fireworks are launched from the wheel to mark New Year.

The London Eye has become widely regarded as a symbol of London. In a 2006 government-commissioned survey, it was also named an icon of modern England. Its image has been depicted inside British passports, in the moquette design on the seats of some London Underground trains, and in the closing ceremony of the 2012 Summer Olympics.

People seeking to settle in the UK or become British citizens may be tested on the height of the London Eye when taking the Life in the UK test.

The structure serves as the focal point for London’s New Year’s Eve celebrations; each year more than 2,000 fireworks are launched from the wheel itself during the televised display.

As of 2025, reports indicated that at least 6,000 wedding proposals had taken place on the attraction.

At the start of the COVID-19 pandemic in 2020, the London Eye joined other landmarks in illuminating in blue as part of the Clap for our Carers campaign in support of National Health Service staff.

Beginning in the 2020s, the London Eye in collaboration with the New Crescent Society started to illuminate once the crescent moon was sighted for the Islamic month of Shawwal marking the beginning of the occasion of Eid Al Fitr.

== Critical reception ==
Sir Richard Rogers, winner of the 2007 Pritzker Architecture Prize, wrote of the London Eye in a book about the project:

The Eye has done for London what the Eiffel Tower did for Paris, which is to give it a symbol and to let people climb above the city and look back down on it. Not just specialists or rich people, but everybody. That's the beauty of it: it is public and accessible, and it is in a great position at the heart of London.

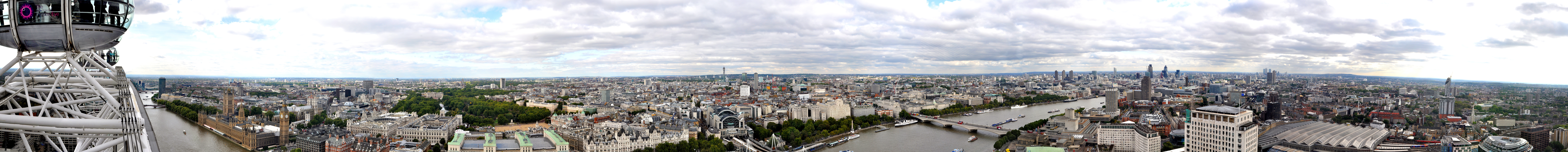
Panoramic skyline seen from the Eye, with Palace of Westminster and Big Ben to the left, Charing Cross railway station centre, and Waterloo railway station to the right
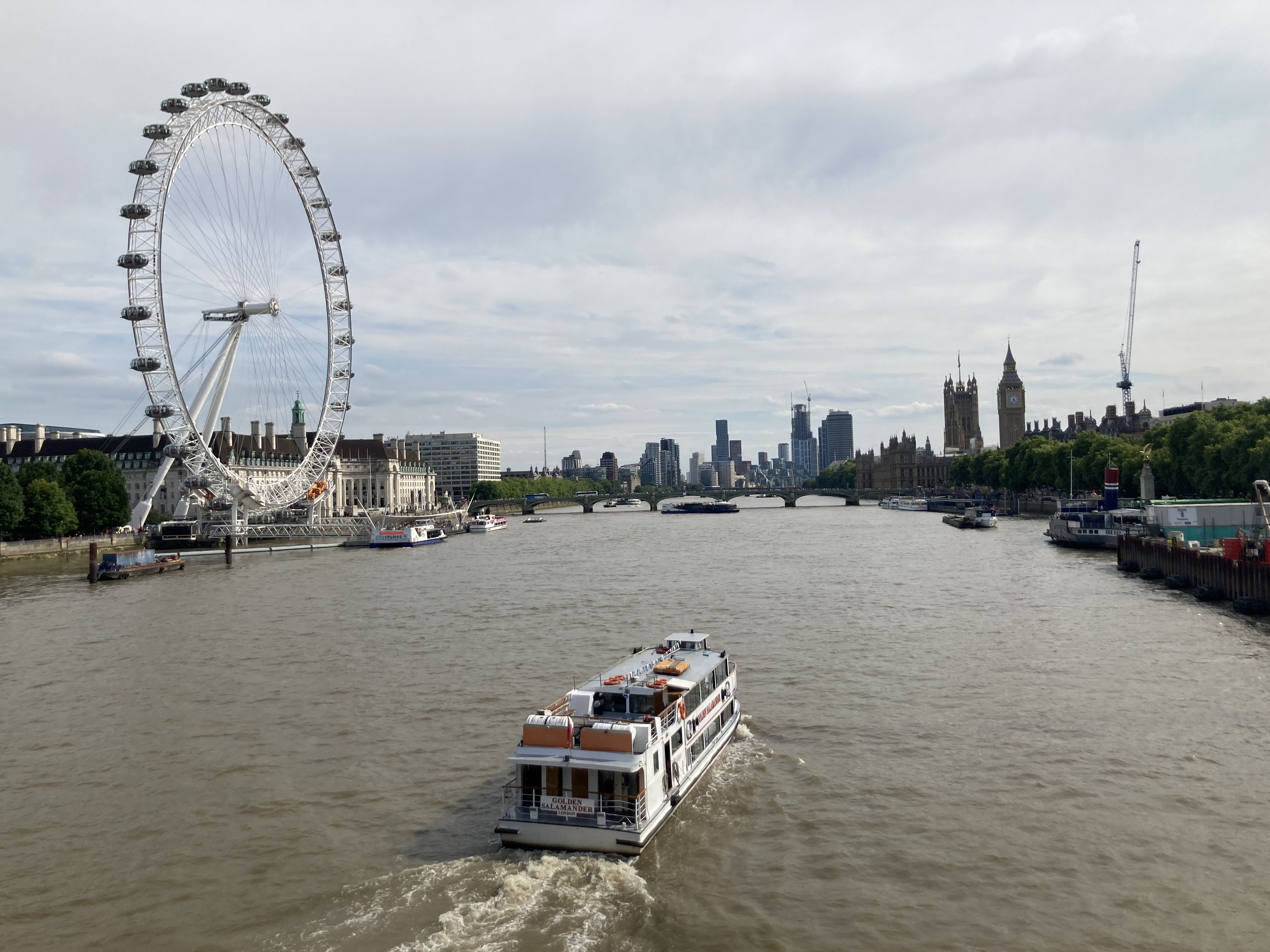
London Eye on the River Thames, with Big Ben in the background

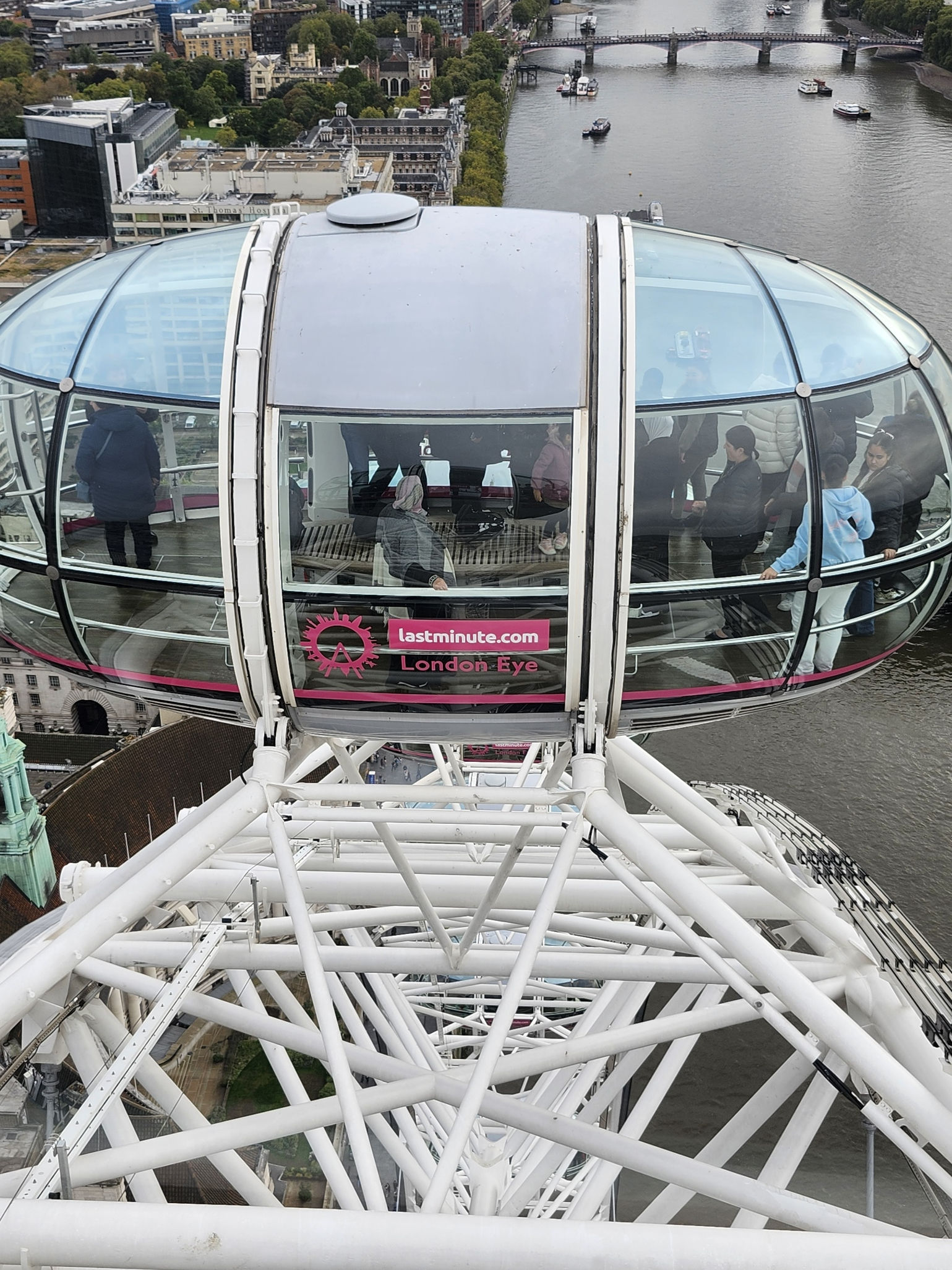
View from the top of the London Eye looking down

== Transport links ==
The nearest London Underground station is Waterloo, although Charing Cross, Embankment, and Westminster are also within easy walking distance.

Connection with National Rail services is made at London Waterloo station and London Waterloo East station.

London River Services operated by Thames Clippers and City Cruises stop at the London Eye Pier.

Preceded by Daikanransha	World's tallest Ferris wheel 2000–2006	Succeeded by Star of Nanchang
