= Julia Barfield =

British architect

Julia Barfield MBE RIBA FSA
- Born: 1952 (age 73–74)
- Education: Architectural Association School of Architecture
- Occupation: Architect
- Partner: David Marks
- Practice: Marks Barfield Architects
- Projects: London Eye

Julia Barfield, MBE RIBA FSA, (born 1952) is a British architect and director of Marks Barfield Architects, established in 1989. Barfield created the London Eye together with husband and partner David Marks. Barfield has interest in vernacular architecture, geometry and in the way nature "designs and organizes itself so efficiently". She was influenced by Buckminster Fuller and his beliefs on how architects have a social and environmental responsibility. Barfield remains involved in a diverse array of projects within architecture, including the categories of culture, education, transportation, sports, leisure, and master planning.

== Education ==
Barfield was drawn to architecture through the influence of a family friend who was an architect. She was interested in the arts and sciences, and believes that "architecture is a bridge" between them. She studied at the Architectural Association School of Architecture in London from 1972 to 1978. She spent a year abroad working in the barriadas of Lima, Peru, where she designed housing and a community centre.

== Experience ==
After graduation, Barfield worked for Foster and Partners for nine years. In 1990, together with husband David Marks, she founded Marks Barfield Architects, designing projects for the leisure, housing, transport, education and cultural sectors.

Barfield has served as an awards assessor for RIBA and the Civic Trust and judges architectural competitions. She lectures at conferences and universities, advises for the Interdisciplinary Design for the Built Environment masters course at Cambridge University, and serves as a governor at Godolphin & Latymer School for girls. She previously served as vice president of the Architectural Association School of Architecture.

== Works ==
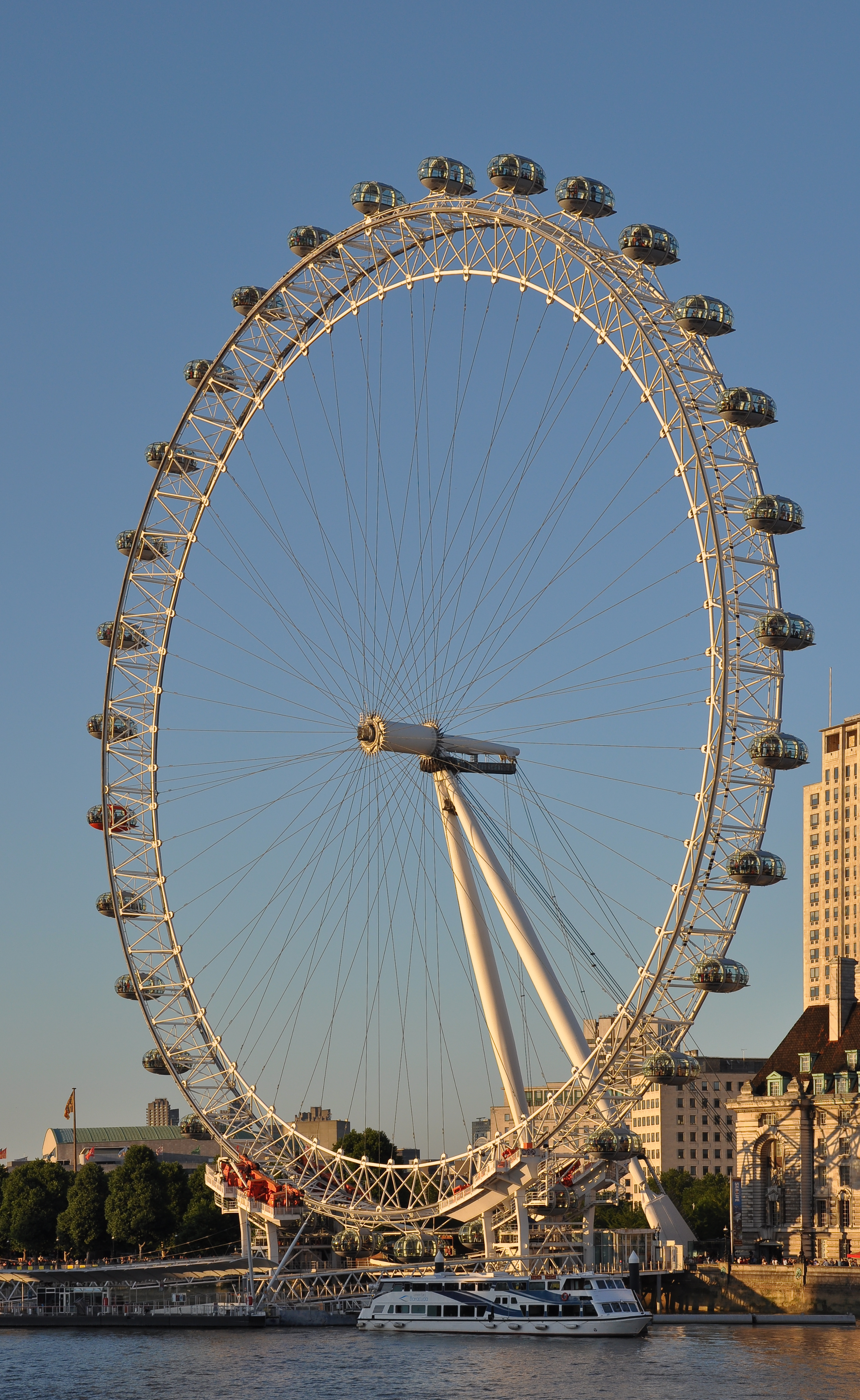

=== London Eye ===
The best thing about the Eye is the journey. It's not like the Eiffel tower, where you get in a dark lift and come out on to a platform at the top. The trip round is as important as the view. -Julia Barfield, 2015

In 1993, the Sunday Times and the Architecture Foundation held an open competition to design a landmark for the millennium. The design submitted by Barfield and Marks, which they called the London Eye, failed to win the competition; in fact, none of the submissions were selected by the judges. The architects decided to erect the landmark anyway, completing it in March 2000 at a cost of £85 million.

== Awards ==
Julia Barfield and her firm have won more than 60 awards for their design, innovation and sustainability. She was appointed Member of the Order of the British Empire (MBE) in the 2000 New Year Honours "for services to the British Airways London Eye."

Barfield is the winner of "Architectural Practice of the Year" in 2001 and a "Queen's Award for Enterprise & Innovation" in 2003.
