= RIBA National Award =

Architecture award

RIBA National Awards form part of an awards programme operated by the Royal Institute of British Architects, which also includes the Stirling Prize, the European Award and the International Award. The National Awards are given to buildings in the UK "recognised as significant contributions to architecture", selected from those that have received a RIBA Regional Award.

The shortlist for each year's Stirling Prize is drawn from that year's National Award recipients.

== Award recipients ==
=== 2008 ===
The following buildings won a National Award in 2008:

- BBC Scotland at Pacific Quay
- Pier Arts Centre
- Hilton Tower
- Manchester Civil Justice Centre
- The Belgrade Theatre
- Accordia
- North Wall Arts Centre
- East Beach Cafe
- Adelaide Wharf
- National Tennis Centre
- Royal Festival Hall
- The Sackler Crossing
- St Marylebone Church of England School Performing Arts Facility
- Terminal 5, Heathrow Airport
- Wembley National Stadium
- Westminster Academy at the Naim Dangoor Centre

=== 2013 ===
The following buildings won a National Award in 2013:

- 4 Linsiander, Isle of Lewis by Studio KAP Architects
- Akerman Health Centre by Henley Halebrown Rorrison
- Astley Castle, Nuneaton, Warwickshire by Witherford Watson Mann
- Beveridge Mews, Stepney Green Estate by Peter Barber
- Bramall Music Building, University of Birmingham by Glenn Howells Architects
- Chapel at Cuddesdon by Niall Maclaughlin
- Chedworth Roman Villa, Yanworth, Gloucestershire by Feilden Clegg Bradley Studios
- Chetham's School of Music, Manchester by Stephenson: ISA Studio
- Church Walk, N16, London by David Mikhail
- Colyer-Fergusson Building, University of Kent by Tim Ronalds Architects
- Crowbrook, Ware, Hertfordshire by Knox Bhavan Architects
- Eastside City Park, Birmingham by Patel Taylor
- Forth Valley College, Stirling by Reiach and Hall Architects
- The Forum, University of Exeter by Wilkinson Eyre
- Giant's Causeway Visitor Centre by Heneghan Peng
- Hayes Primary School, London Borough of Croydon by Hayhurst and Co
- Heartlands, Redruth by Stride Treglown
- The Hive, Worcester by Feilden Clegg Bradley Studios
- Ironmonger Row Baths, Norman Street, London by Tim Ronalds
- Jerwood Gallery, Hastings by HAT Projects
- Jesmond Gardens Primary School, Hartlepool
- Kingswood Academy, Hull by AHMM
- Lauriston School, Rutland Road, London by Meadowcroft Griffin/MLA
- M&S Cheshire Oaks by Aukett Fitzroy Robinson
- The MAC, Belfast by Hackett Hall McKnight
- Mareel, Lerwick by Gareth Hoskins Architects with PJP Architects
- Manchester Metropolitan University Business School by Feilden Clegg Bradley Studio
- Montpelier Community Nursery, Brecknock Road, London by AYA
- Newhall Be, Harlow, Essex by Alison Brooks Architects
- North London Hospice, Barrowell Green, London by Allford Hall Monaghan Morris
- Olympic Energy Centre, Olympic Park, London by John McAslan
- Olympic Masterplan, London by Allies and Morrison
- Park Hill, Sheffield by Hawkins\Brown and Studio Egret West
- Quadrant 3, Air Street, London by Dixon Jones with Donald Insall Associates
- Sir Duncan Rice Library, University of Aberdeen by Schmidt
- Slip House, London by Carl Turner
- SOAR Works, Parson Cross, Sheffield by 00:/
- St Alban's Academy, Birmingham by dRMM
- Chapel of Saint Albert the Great, Edinburgh by Simpson and Brown
- St Silas CofE Primary School, Blackburn by Capita Symonds
- Stowe Gardens Visitor Centre by Cowper Griffith
- UCH Cancer Care Centre, London by Hopkins Architects
- West Wing, Saïd Business School, Oxford by Dixon Jones

=== 2014 ===
The following buildings won a National Award in 2014:

- 261 West Princes Street, Edinburgh by Elder & Cannon Architects
- Architecture Archive, Somerset by Hugh Strange Architects
- Brent Civic Centre by Hopkins Architects
- The Bridge, Scottish Water by Reiach & Hall Architects
- Brighton College Boarding House by Allies and Morrison
- Britten-Pears Archive by Stanton Williams
- Cliff House, Isle of Skye by Dualchas Architects
- Ditchling Museum of Art + Craft by Adam Richards Architects
- Drapers Academy by Feilden Clegg Bradley Studios
- Everyman Theatre, Liverpool by Haworth Tompkins
- Golden Lane, London by Amin Taha Architects
- Hargood Close, Colchester by Proctor & Matthews
- House No. 7, Isle of Tiree by Denizen Works
- John Henry Brookes Building, Oxford Brookes University by Design Engine Architects
- JW3, London by Lifschutz Davidson Sandilands
- King's Cross Station redevelopment by John McAslan + Partners
- The Lee Building, Ralph Allen School by Fielden Fowles Architects with Feilden Clegg Bradley Studios
- Library of Birmingham by Mecanoo
- London Aquatics Centre by Zaha Hadid Architects
- London Bridge Tower/The Shard by Renzo Piano Building Workshop
- London Library by Haworth Tompkins
- Luker House by Jamie Fobert Architects
- Manchester School of Art by Feilden Clegg Bradley Studios
- Manor Works, Sheffield by 00:/
- Mary Rose Museum by Wilkinson Eyre Architects
- Millbank Project, Tate Britain by Caruso St John Architects
- The Novium, Chichester by Keith Williams Architects
- Officer's Field, Portland by HTA Design
- One Pancras Square, London by David Chipperfield Architects
- Ortus by Duggan Morris Architects for Maudsley Learning
- Police Service of Northern Ireland Memorial Garden by Hall McKnight
- Poole Harbour Second Crossing by Wilkinson Eyre Architects
- Porthmeor Studios, St Ives by Long & Kentish Architects
- Rambert by Allies and Morrison
- Red Bridge House, Crowborough by Smerin Architects
- Ritblat Building, Hilden Grange School by Hawkins\Brown
- Saw Swee Hock Centre, London School of Economics by O'Donnell + Tuomey Architects
- Saxon Court & Roseberry Mansions by Maccreanor Lavington
- Seizure Gallery, Yorkshire Sculpture Park by Adam Khan Architects
- St George's Chapel, Great Yarmouth by Hopkins Architects
- TNG Youth and Community Centre, London by RCKa
- Waverley School, Birmingham by AHMM
- The Wilson, Cheltenham by Berman Guedes Stretton

=== 2015 ===
The following buildings won a National Award in 2015:

- Abode, Cambridgeshire – Proctor and Matthews Architects
- Alfriston School, Buckinghamshire – Duggan Morris Architects
- Arcadia Nursery, University of Edinburgh – Malcolm Fraser Architects
- Ashmount Primary School and Bowlers Nursery – Penoyre & Prasad
- Bonhams – Lifschutz Davidson Sandilands
- Brentford Lock West, London – Duggan Morris Architects
- Burntwood School – Allford Hall Monaghan Morris
- Cliff House, Swansea – Hyde + Hyde Architects
- Dalmunach Distillery, Moray – Archial NORR
- Darbishire Place, London – Niall McLaughlin Architects
- Dundon Passivhaus, Somerset – Prewett Bizley Architects
- Engineering Building, Lancaster University – John McAslan + Partners
- Flint House, Buckinghamshire – Skene Catling de la Peña
- Foyles, London – Lifschutz Davidson Sandilands
- House at Maghera, County Down – McGonigle McGrath
- Hult International Business School, London – Sergison Bates Architects
- Kew House, London – Piercy & Company
- Laurieston Transformational Area – Elder & Cannon Architects and Page\Park
- Levring House, London – Jamie Fobert Architects
- Maggie's Cancer Care Centre, Lanarkshire – Reiach and Hall
- Middleport Pottery – Feilden Clegg Bradley Studios
- Myrtle Cottage Garden Studio, Wiltshire – Stonewood Design
- National Theatre, London – Haworth Tompkins
- NEO Bankside, London – Rogers Stirk Harbour + Partners
- Old See House, Belfast – RPP Architects and Richard Murphy Architects
- Parkside, Derbyshire – Evans Vettori
- School of Architecture, Greenwich University – Heneghan Peng Architects
- Sheffield Cathedral Gateway Project – Thomas Ford & Partners
- St. Mary of Eton, London – Matthew Lloyd Architects
- Sussex House, South Downs – Wilkinson King Architects
- The Fishing Hut, Hampshire – Niall McLaughlin Architects
- The Foundry, London – Architecture 00
- The Union, Manchester Metropolitan University – Feilden Clegg Bradley Studios
- Uppingham School Science Centre – Orms
- West Burn Lane, St Andrews – Sutherland Hussey
- The Whitworth, Manchester – MUMA
- WWF Headquarters, Woking – Hopkins Architects

=== 2016 ===
The following buildings won a National Award in 2016:

- 51 Hills Road – Gort Scott for Jesus College, Cambridge
- 61 Oxford Street – Allford Hall Monaghan Morris for Dukelease Properties and BA Pensions Trust
- Alder Hey Children's Hospital – BDP for Alder Hey Children's NHS Trust
- Ark All Saints Academy and Highshore School – Allford Hall Monaghan Morris for Balfour Beatty, Southwark Council and Ark
- Banbridge Health and Care Centre – Kennedy Fitzgerald Architects with Avanti Architects for the Southern Health and Social Care Trust
- Blavatnik School of Government – Herzog & de Meuron for the Blavatnik School of Government
- Bob Champion Research and Education Building – Hawkins\Brown for the University of East Anglia
- Riverside Campus, City of Glasgow College – Michael Laird Architects and Reiach And Hall Architects for City of Glasgow College
- Corner House – DSDHA for Derwent London
- Davenies School – DSDHA for Davenies School
- Derry Avenue – Bell Phillips Architects for Thurrock Council Housing Department
- Drawing Studio – CRAB studio for Arts University Bournemouth
- Ely Court, South Kilburn – Alison Brooks Architects Ltd and Hester Architects for Catalyst Housing
- Albert Sloman Library and Silberrad Student Centre – Patel Taylor for University of Essex
- Gloucester Services – Glenn Howells Architects with AFL Architects for Westmorland Ltd
- Greenwich Gateway Pavilions – Marks Barfield Architects for Knight Dragon
- Greenwich Housing – Bell Phillips Architects for a private client
- Heart of Campus – Evans Vettori Architects for Nottingham Trent University
- Hebburn Central – FaulknerBrowns Architects for South Tyneside Metropolitan Borough Council
- HOME – Mecanoo for Manchester City Council
- House of Trace – Tsuruta Architects for a private client
- Laidlaw Library – ADP LLP for University of Leeds
- Maurice Wohl Clinical Neuroscience Institute – Allies and Morrison and PM Devereux
- Murphy House – Richard Murphy Architects
- National Graphene Institute – Jestico + Whiles and CH2M for University of Manchester
- Newport Street Gallery – Caruso St John Architects for a private client
- Outhouse – Loyn & Co Architects for a private client
- Private House, Cumbria – Bennetts Associates for a private client
- Private House, Northamptonshire – James Gorst Architects for a private client
- Sir John Soane's Museum – Julian Harrap Architects for the Trustees of Sir John Soane's Museum
- St James' Square – Eric Parry Architects for Gree Property
- Stanbrook Abbey – Feilden Clegg Bradley Studios for Conventus of Our Lady of Consolation, Stanbrook Abbey
- The Avenue – Pollard Thomas Edwards for Hill
- The Cheeran House – John Pardey Architects for a private client
- The Investcorp Building – Zaha Hadid Architects for the Middle East Centre, St Antony's College, Oxford
- The Portland Collection – Hugh Broughton Architects for the Harley Gallery and Foundation
- Trafalgar Place, Elephant and Castle – DRMM for Lend Lease
- Weston Library – WilkinsonEyre for the University of Oxford
- Wilton's Music Hall – Tim Ronalds Architects for Wilson's Music Hall Trust
- Wirral Metropolitan College – Glenn Howells Architects for Peel Holdings
- York Art Gallery – Ushida Findlay Simpson Brown for York Museums Trust

=== 2017 ===
The following buildings won a National Award in 2017:

- 40 Chancery Lane – Bennetts Associates for Derwent London
- 8 Finsbury Circus – WilkinsonEyre for Mitsubishi Estate London and Stanhope
- Barretts Grove – Amin Taha + Groupwork for Nick Grant
- Bedales School Art and Design Building – Feilden Clegg Bradley Studios for Beadales School
- Blackburn Meadows Biomass – BDP for E.ON Energy
- British Airways i360 – Marks Barfield Architects for Brighton i360 Ltd
- Caring Wood – James Macdonald Wright and Niall Maxwell for a private client
- Carrowbreck Meadow – Hamson Barron Smith for Broadland Growth Ltd
- Chetham's School of Music Stoller Hall – Stephenson Studio for Chetham's School of Music
- City of Glasgow College City Campus – Reiach And Hall Architects and Michael Laird Architects for City of Glasgow College
- Command of the Oceans – Baynes and Mitchell Architects for Chatham Historic Dockyard
- Derwenthorpe Phase One – Studio Partington for Joseph Rowntree Housing Trust
- Dujardin Mews – Karakusevic Carson with Maccreanor Lavington for the London Borough of Enfield
- Dyson Campus Expansion – WilkinsonEyre for Dyson
- Fallahogey Studio – McGarry-Moon Architects for McGarry-Moon Architects
- Finlays Warehouse – Stephenson Studio for Facetspera Ltd
- Hastings Pier – dRMM Architects for the Hastings Pier Charity
- King's College School – Allies and Morrison for King's College School
- Leicester Cathedral's Richard III Project 'With Dignity and Honour' – van Heyningen and Haward Architects for Leicester Cathedral
- Live Works – Flanagan Lawrence for Live Theatre
- Liverpool Philharmonic – Caruso St John Architects for Royal Liverpool Philharmonic
- Magdalen College Library – Wright & Wright Architects for Magdalen College
- Maggie's at the Robert Parfett Building – Foster + Partners for Maggie's
- New Music Facilities for Wells Cathedral School – Eric Parry Architects for Wells Cathedral School
- New Scotland Yard – Allford Hall Monaghan Morris for the Metropolitan Police Service
- Newhouse of Auchengree – Ann Nisbet Studio for a private client
- Number 49 – 31/44 Architects for a private client
- Paradise Gardens – Lifschutz Davidson Sandilands for Ravenscourt Studios Ltd
- Peacock House – BHSF Architekten with Studio-P for Jila and Andrew Peacock
- Photography Studio – 6a architects for Juergen Teller Ltd
- Remembrance Centre at the National Memorial Arboretum – Glenn Howells Architects for the National Memorial Arboretum
- Rockvilla – Hoskins Architects for the National Theatre of Scotland
- Shawm House – MawsonKerr Architects for Richard, Tony and Anne Pender
- Silchester – Haworth Tompkins for Peabody
- South Street – Sandy Rendel Architects for a private client
- St Albans Abbey – Richard Griffiths Architects for the Cathedral and Abbey Church of St Alban
- Tate Modern Blavatnik Building – Herzog & de Meuron for the Tate
- The Berrow Foundation Building and New Garden at Lincoln College – Stanton Williams with Rodney Melville and Partners for Lincoln College, University of Oxford
- The British Museum World Conservation and Exhibitions Centre – Roger Stirk Harbour + Partners for the British Museum
- The Enterprise Centre, University of East Anglia – Archetype for Adapt Low Carbon Group and The University of East Anglia
- The Laboratory, Dulwich College – Grimshaw for Dulwich College
- The Loom – Duggan Morris Architects for Helical plc
- The Welding Institute – Eric Parry Architects for TWI Ltd
- The Word – FaulknerBrowns Architects for South Tyneside Council
- Vajrasana Buddhist Retreat Centre – Walters & Cohen Architects for the London Buddhist Centre
- Victoria Gate Arcades – ACME for Hammerson plc
- Walmer Yard – Peter Salter and Associates with Mole Architects and John Comparelli Architects for a private client
- Warwick Hall Community Centre – Acanthus Clews Architects for St John the Baptist Church, Burford
- Wolfson Tree Management Centre – Invisible Studio for the Forestry Commission

=== 2018 ===
The following buildings won a National Award in 2018:

- 15 Clerkenwell Close – Amin Taha Architects and Groupwork for 15CC
- 25 Savile Row – Piercy&Company for Derwent London
- 53 Great Suffolk Street – Hawkins\Brown for Morgan Capital Partners
- Albert Works – Cartwright Pickard Architects for City Estates
- Bethnal Green Memorial – Arboreal Architecture for Stairway to Heaven Memorial Trust
- Bloomberg London – Foster + Partners for Bloomberg
- Boroughmuir High School – Allan Murray Architects for the Children & Families Department, City of Edinburgh Council
- Bushey Cemetery – Waugh Thistleton Architects for The United Synagogue
- Chadwick Hall – Henley Halebrown for the University of Roehampton
- City of London Freemen's School Swimming Pool – Hawkins\Brown for City of London Freemen's School
- Coastal House – 6a Architects for a private client
- Durham Cathedral Open Treasure – Purcell for Durham Cathedral
- Five Acre Barn – Blee Halligan for Five Acre Barn
- Flexible House – Amin Taha + Groupwork for a private client
- Gasholders London – WilkinsonEyre with Jonathan Tuckey Design for King's Cross Central Limited Partnership
- King's Crescent Estate Phases 1 and 2 – Karakusevic Carson Architects and Henley Halebrown for the London Borough of Hackney
- Kingsgate Primary Lower School – Maccreanor Lavington Architects for the London Borough of Camden
- Knox Bhavan Studio – Knox Bhavan Architects for Simon Knox & Sasha Bhavan
- Liverpool's Royal Court – Allford Hall Monaghan Morris for Royal Court Theatre Trust
- Lochside House – HaysomWardMiller Architects for a private client
- Maggie's Oldham – dRMM Architects for Maggie's
- Marlborough Primary School – Dixon Jones for the Royal Borough of Kensington & Chelsea
- New Tate, St Ives – Jamie Fobert Architects with Evans & Shalev for Tate St Ives
- Nucleus, the Nuclear Decommissioning Authority and Caithness Archive – Reiarch and Hall Architects for the Nuclear Decommissioning Authority
- Old Shed New House – Tonkin Liu for a private client
- R7 King's Cross – Morris + Company and Weedon Architects for Argent LLP
- Riverlight – Rogers Stirk Harbour + Partners and EPR Architects for St James Group Limited
- Royal Academy of Music, The Susie Sainsbury Theatre and The Angela Burgess Recital Hall – Ian Ritchie Architects for the Royal Academy of Music
- Royal Albert Wharf Phase 1 – Maccreanor Lavington for Notting Hill Housing Group
- Royal Birmingham Conservatoire – Feilden Clegg Bradley Studios for Birmingham City University
- Shaftesbury Theatre – Bennetts Associates for the Theatre of Comedy Company
- Sibson Building – Penoyre & Prasad for University of Kent
- St Augustines Church – Roz Barr Architects for the Order of St Augustine
- St David's Hospice New In-patient Unit – KKE Architects for St David's Hospice Care
- Storey's Field Centre and Eddington Nursery – MUMA LLP for University of Cambridge
- Storyhouse – Bennetts Associates and Ellis Williams Architects for Cheshire West and Chester Council
- The David Attenborough Building – Nicholas Hare Architects for University of Cambridge
- The Department Store – Squire and Partners for Squire and Partners
- The Leadenhall Building – Rogers Stirk Harbour + Partners for British Land
- The Piece Hall and Calderdale Central Library and Archives – LDN Architects LLP for Calderdale Metropolitan Borough Council
- The Sultan Nazrin Shah Centre – Niall McLaughlin Architects for Worcester College, Oxford
- University of Birmingham Indoor Sports Centre – Lifschutz Davidson Sandilands for University of Birmingham
- University of Roehampton Library – Feilden Clegg Bradley Studios for University of Roehampton
- V&A Exhibition Road Quarter – AL_A for the Victoria and Albert Museum
- Victoria Hall King's Cross – Stanton Williams for Aga Khan Development Network
- Walthamstow Wetlands – Witherford Watson Mann and Kinnear Landscape Architects for Waltham Forest Council
- West Court Jesus College – Niall McLaughlin Architects for Jesus College, Cambridge
- Weston Street – Allford Hall Monaghan Morris for Solidspace
- White Collar Factory – Allford Hall Monaghan Morris for Derwent London

=== 2019 ===
The following buildings won a National Award in 2019:

- 168 Upper Street – Groupwork for Aria
- 4 Pancras Square – Eric Parry Architects for Argent
- Alexandra Palace – Feilden Clegg Bradley Studios for Alexandra Park & Palace Charitable Trust
- Battersea Arts Centre – Haworth Tompkins for Battersea Arts Centre
- Beecroft Building – Hawkins\Brown for the University of Oxford
- Brentford Lock West Keelson Gardens – Mae for Waterside Places
- Bristol Old Vic – Haworth Tompkins for the Bristol Old Vic
- Coal Drops Yard – Heatherwick Studio for King's Cross Central Limited Partnership
- Collective on Calton Hill – Collective Architecture for City of Edinburgh Council and Collective
- Colin Connect Transport Hub and Town Square – Hall McKnight for Department for Infrastructure
- Cork House – Matthew Barnett Howland with Dido Milne and Oliver Wilton
- The Dorothy Garrod Building – Walters & Cohen for Newnham College, Cambridge
- Eddington Lot 1, North West Cambridge – WilkinsonEyre with Mole Architects for the University of Cambridge
- Eddington Masterplan – AECOM for the University of Cambridge
- Eleanor Palmer Science Lab – AY Architects for Eleanor Palmer Primary School
- Goldsmith Street – Mikhail Riches with Cathy Hawley for Norwich City Council
- Great Arthur House – John Robertson Architects for the City of London Corporation
- Hackney Wick Station – Landolt + Brown for London Legacy Development Corporation and Network Rail
- Hampshire House – Niall McLaughlin Architects for a private client
- Hill House Passivhaus – Meloy Architects for Meloy Architects
- House Lessans – McGonigle McGrath for a private client
- Kettle's Yard – Jamie Fobert Architects for Kettle's Yard
- Kingswood Prep School and Nursery – Stonewood Design for a private client
- LAMDA – Niall McLaughlin Architects for LAMDA
- London Bridge Station – Grimshaw Architects for Network Rail
- The Macallan Distillery and Visitor Experience – Rogers Stirk Harbour + Partners for Edrington
- Mackintosh at the Willow – Simpson & Brown for Willow Tea Rooms Trust
- Mapleton Crescent – Metropolitan Workshop for Pocket Living
- Marmalade Lane – Mole Architects for TOWN and Trivselhus with Cambridge Cohousing
- Merano – Rogers Stirk Harbour + Partners with EPR Architects for St James
- Music School, King's College School, Wimbledon – Hopkins Architects for King's College School, Wimbledon
- Nevill Holt Opera – Witherford Watson Mann for Nevill Holt Opera
- Nithurst Farm – Adam Richards Architects for Adam Richards Architects
- North West Cambridge Utility Buildings – Robin Lee Architecture for the University of Cambridge
- Ordsall Chord – BDP for Network Rail
- The Painted Hall – Hugh Broughton Architects for the Greenwich Foundation
- Peter Hall Performing Arts Centre – Haworth Tompkins for The Perse School
- Pitzhanger Manor and Gallery – Jestico + Whiles with Julian Harrap Architects for Ealing Council and Pitzhanger Manor and Gallery Trust
- Preston Bus Station Refurbishment – John Puttick Associates and Cassidy+Ashton for Lancashire County Council
- The Queen's Diamond Jubilee Galleries – MUMA for Westminster Abbey
- A Restorative Rural Retreat for Sartfell – Foster Lomas for a private client
- Royal Opera House Open Up – Stanton Williams for the Royal Opera House
- Secular Retreat – Atelier Peter Zumthor with Mole Architects for Living Architecture
- Science and Technology and Global Study Centres, Sevenoaks School – Tim Ronalds Architects for Sevenoaks School
- Signal Townhouses – Allford Hall Monaghan Morris for U+I
- Simon Sainsbury Centre, Cambridge Judge Business School – Stanton Williams for the University of Cambridge
- Southbank Centre – Feilden Clegg Bradley Studios for the Southbank Centre
- South London Gallery Fire Station – 6a architects for the South London Gallery
- Teaching and Learning Building – Make Architects for the University of Nottingham
- Television Centre – Allford Hall Monaghan Morris for Stanhope, Mitsui Fudosan, AIMCo and BBC Studioworks
- Westminster Abbey Triforum Project – Ptolemy Dean Architects for Westminster Abbey
- The Weston, Yorkshire Sculpture Park – Feilden Fowles for the Yorkshire Sculpture Park
- Writ in Water – Mark Wallinger with Studio Octopi for the National Trust

=== 2020 ===
Due to the COVID-19 pandemic, the 2020 awards were postponed to 2021.

=== 2021 ===
The following buildings won a National Award in 2021:

- 95 Peckham Road – Peter Barber Architects for Kuropatwa Ltd.
- Aberdeen Art Gallery – Hoskins Architects for Aberdeen City Council
- Bath School of Art and Design – Grimshaw Architects for Bath Spa University
- Bayes Centre – Bennetts Associates for the University of Edinburgh
- Blackfriars Circus – Maccreanor Lavington for Barratt London
- School of Science and Sport – Office for Metropolitan Architecture for Brighton College
- Cambridge Central Mosque – Marks Barfield for the Cambridge Mosque Trust
- Caudale Housing Scheme – Mæ Architects for Camden Council
- Centre Building – Rogers Stirk Harbour + Partners for the London School of Economics
- Centre for Creative Learning – Building Design Partnership for Francis Holland School
- Clore Music Studios – John McAslan + Partners for New College, Oxford
- Dorothy Wadham Building – Allies and Morrison for Wadham College, Oxford
- English National Ballet at the Mulryan Centre for Dance – Glenn Howells Architects for the English National Ballet
- Floating Church – Denizen Works for the Diocese of London
- House-Within-a-House – Alma-nac
- Imperial War Museums Paper Store – Architype for the Imperial War Museum
- JLR Advanced Product Creation Centre – Bennetts Associates for Jaguar Land Rover
- Key Worker Housing, Eddington – Stanton Williams for the University of Cambridge and North West Cambridge development
- Town House – Grafton Architects for Kingston University
- Lower Mountjoy Teaching and Learning Centre – FaulknerBrowns Architects for Durham University
- Maggie's Cardiff – Dow Jones Architects for Maggie's Cardiff
- MK Gallery – 6a architects for MK Gallery
- Moore Park Mews – Stephen Taylor Architects for Baylight Properties
- Pegasus Moor's Nook – Coffey Architects for Lifestory
- River House – John Pardey Architects for a private client
- North Street – Peter Barber Architects for BeFirst – London Borough of Barking
- The Oglesby Centre at Hallé St Peter's – stephenson hamilton risley STUDIO for Hallé Concerts Society
- Library and Study Centre, St Giles' – Wright & Wright Architects for St John's College, Oxford
- Pele Tower House – Woollacott Gilmartin Architects for a private client
- The Prof. Lord Bhattacharyya Building – Cullinan Studio for the University of Warwick, Warwick Manufacturing Group, Jaguar Land Rover and Tata Motors Group
- The Outfarm – TYPE Studio for a private client
- Royal Academy of Arts – David Chipperfield Architects for the Royal Academy of Arts
- Royal College of Pathologists – Bennetts Associates for the Royal College of Pathologists
- National Sports Training Centre Inverclyde – Reiach and Hall Architects for sportscotland
- The Egg Shed – Oliver Chapman Architects for Scottish Canals
- The Gables – DK-Architects for Musker Developments
- Hill House Box – Carmody Groarke for the National Trust for Scotland
- The King's School, Canterbury International College – Walters & Cohen for The King's School, Canterbury
- The Malthouse, The King's School, Canterbury – Tim Ronalds Architects for The King's School, Canterbury
- The Ray, Farringdon – Allford Hall Monaghan for Viridis Real Estate Services Ltd.
- The Rye Apartments – Tikari Works for Metropolitan Projects
- The Standard, London – Orms, Shawn Hausman Design, and Archer Humphryes Architects for Crosstree Real Estate Partners
- The Story of Gardening – Stonewood Design, Mark Thomas Architects, and Henry Fagan Engineering for The Newt in Somerset
- The Student Centre UCL – Nicholas Hare Architects for University College London
- Tiger Way – Hawkins\Brown for the London Borough of Hackney
- Tintagel Castle Footbridge – Ney & Partners for English Heritage
- Tottenham Hotspur Stadium – Populous for Tottenham Hotspur F.C.
- The Water Tower – Tonkin Liu for Dennis Pedersen
- Walmer Castle and Gardens Learning Centre – Adam Richards Architects for English Heritage and the Heritage Lottery Fund
- Winchester Cathedral South Transept Exhibition Spaces – Nick Cox Architects for Winchester Cathedral
- Windermere Jetty – Carmody Groarke for Lakeland Arts
- House on the Hill – Alison Brooks Architects for a private client
- Wooden Roof – Tsuruta Architects
- Zayed Centre for Research – Stanton Williams for Great Ormond Street Hospital and UCL Great Ormond Street Institute of Child Health

=== 2022 ===
The following buildings won a National Award in 2022:

- 100 Liverpool Street – Hopkins Architects for British Land
- Aisher House – Tim Ronalds Architects for Sevenoaks School
- BFI Riverfront – Carmody Groarke for the British Film Institute
- Creek House – Seth Stein Architects for a private client
- Falkirk Campus – Reiach and Hall Architects for Forth Valley College
- Guildford Crematorium – Haverstock for Guildford Crematorium
- Hackney New Primary School and 333 Kingsland Road – Henley Halebrown for Downham Road Ltd.
- Harris Academy Sutton – Architype for London Borough of Sutton
- Hawley Wharf – Allford Hall Monaghan Morris for LabTech
- High Sunderland – Loader Monteith for Juliet Kinchin and Paul Stirton
- House at Lough Beg – McGonigle McGrath for a private client
- Kiln Place – Peter Barber Architects for London Borough of Camden
- Ibstock Place School Refectory – Maccreanor Lavington for Ibstock Place School
- LB Southwark SILS3 – Tim Ronalds Architects for London Borough of Southwark
- Lovedon Fields – John Pardey Architects for HAB Housing Ltd.
- The New Library, Magdalene College – Niall McLaughlin Architects for Magdalene College
- Master's Field Development – Niall McLaughlin Architects for Balliol College, Oxford
- Orchard Gardens, Elephant Park – Panter Hudspith Architects for Lendlease
- Quarry Studios – Moxon Architects for themselves
- Sands End Arts and Community Centre – Mæ Architects for Hammersmith and Fulham Council
- Church of St John-at-Hackney – Thomas Ford & Partners with John Pawson for St John-at-Hackney
- Suffolk Cottage – Haysom Ward Miller Architects for Liz and Tom Miller
- Surbiton Springs – Surman Weston for a private client
- Sutton Hoo – Nissen Richards Studio for the National Trust
- The Mitchell Building, The Skinners' School – Bell Phillips Architects for The Skinners' School
- Winsford Cottage Hospital – benjamin+beauchamp architects for the Landmark Trust
- The Alice Hawthorn – De Matos Ryan for Mr and Mrs Richard Harpin
- The Fratry – Feilden Fowles for Carlisle Cathedral
- The Parchment Works – Will Gamble Architects for a private client

=== 2023 ===
The following buildings won a National Award in 2023:

- Agar Grove Phase 1b – Mæ and Hawkins\Brown for Camden Council
- Blackbird – Nicholas Lyons with Hamish Herford for a private client
- Bloqs – 5th Studio for Enfield Council and Bloqs
- Brick House – Howells for Urban Splash
- Central Somers Town Community Facilities and Housing – Adam Khan Architects for the London Borough of Camden
- Courtauld Connects – Witherford Watson Mann for the Courtauld Institute of Art
- Cuddymoss – Ann Nisbet Studio for a private client
- Edith Neville Primary School – Hayhurst & Co Architects for the London Borough of Camden
- Great Things Lie Ahead, 2020, Holborn House – 6a architects and Caragh Thuring for Holborn Community Association
- Hanover – Lifschutz Davidson Sandilands for GPE
- Hill House – McGonigle McGrath for a private client
- A House for Artists – Apparata Architects for the London Borough of Barking and Dagenham
- Hundred Acre Wood – Denizen Works for a private client
- Hushh House – Elliott Architects for a private client
- John Morden Centre – Mæ for Morden College
- Laidlaw Music Centre, University of St Andrews – Flanagan Lawrence for the University of St Andrews
- Lavender Hill Courtyard Housing – Sergison Bates Architects for Marston Properties
- Lea Bridge Library Pavilion – Studio Weave for the London Borough of Waltham Forest
- Manchester Jewish Museum – Citizens Design Bureau for the Manchester Jewish Museum
- Middle Avenue – Rural Office for a private client
- Pen Y Common – Nidus Architects and Rural Office for a private client
- Radley College Chapel extension – Purcell Architecture Ltd for Radley College
- Rhossili House – Maich Swift Architects for a private client
- Saltmarsh House – Niall McLaughlin Architects for a private client
- Spruce House and Studio – ao-ft for a private client
- Swing Bridge – Tonkin Liu, Arup and Cake Industries for Friends of Crystal Palace Dinosaurs
- Taylor & Chatto Courts and Wilmott Court – Henley Halebrown for Hackney Council
- The Kit Kat Club at the Playhouse Theatre – Carmondy Groarke for Ambassadors Theatre Group
- The Fireworks Factory at Woolwich Works – Bennetts Associates for the Royal Borough of Greenwich
- University of Warwick Faculty of Arts – Feilden Clegg Bradley Studios for the University of Warwick

=== 2024 ===
The following buildings won a National Award in 2024:

- Alfreton Park Community Special School – Curl la Tourelle Head Architecture for Alfreton Park Community Special School
- Tower and Faith Museum, Auckland Castle – Niall McLaughlin Architects and Purcell for the Auckland Project
- Bath Abbey Footprint Project – Feilden Clegg Bradley Studios for Bath Abbey
- Battersea Power Station Phase Two – WilkinsonEyre for Battersea Power Station Development Company
- Beechwood Village – Pollard Thomas Edwards for Swan Housing
- Bradbury Works – [Y/N] Studio for Hackney Co-operative Developments
- Chowdhury Walk – Al-Jawad Pike for the London Borough of Hackney
- Farmworker's House – Hugh Strange Architects for a private client
- Fruitmarket Gallery, Edinburgh (refurbishment) – Reiach and Hall Architects for Fruitmarket Gallery
- Dining Hall, Homerton College, Cambridge – Feilden Fowles for Homerton College
- House on Redbrae Farm – McGonigle McGrath Architects for a private client
- King's Cross Masterplan – Allies and Morrison and Porphyrios Associates for Argent on behalf of King's Cross Central Partnership
- National Portrait Gallery, London (refurbishment) – Jamie Fobert Architects and Purcell for the National Portrait Gallery
- New Temple Complex, Hampshire – James Gorst Architects for the White Eagle Lodge
- North Gate Social Housing – Page\Park Architects for New Gorbals Housing Association Ltd
- Paddington Elizabeth Line Station – Weston Williamson for Transport for London
- Park Hill, Sheffield Phase 2 (refurbishment) – Mikhail Riches for Urban Splash and Places for People
- Royal Academy of Dance – Takero Shimazaki Architects for the Royal Academy of Dance
- Flaxmill Maltings, Shrewsbury (repurposing) – Feilden Clegg Bradley Studios for Historic England
- Six Columns – 31/44 Architects for Sam and Will Burges
- Thames Christian School and Battersea Chapel – Henley Halebrown for Thames Christian School
- The Arbour – Boehm Lynas and GS8 for GS8
- The Black & White Building – Waugh Thistleton Architects for The Office Group
- The Elizabeth Line – Grimshaw, Maynard, Equation, and AtkinsRéalis for Crossrail
- WongAvery Music Gallery – Niall McLaughlin Architects for Trinity Hall, Cambridge
- Wraxall Yard – Clementine Blakemore Architects for Wraxall Yard

=== 2025 ===
The following buildings won a National Award in 2025:

- 8 Bleeding Heart Yard – GROUPWORK for Seaforth Land Holdings
- Aldourie Castle Estate – Ptolemy Dean Architects for Wildland
- Appleby Blue Almshouse – Witherford Watson Mann Architects for United St Saviour’s Charity
- Citizens House – Archio for London CLT
- Costa's Barbers – Brisco Loran and Arrant Industries for Duncan Blackmore
- Elizabeth Tower – Purcell for Strategic Estates/UK Parliament
- Fairburn Tower – Simpson and Brown for The Landmark Trust
- Hastings House – Hugh Strange Architects
- Hazelmead, Bridport Cohousing – Barefoot Architects for Bridport Cohousing CLT
- HMP and YOI Stirling – Holmes Miller for the Scottish Prison Service
- Hope Street – Snug Architects for One Small Thing
- London College of Fashion – Allies and Morrison
- Niwa House – Takero Shimakazi Architects
- Sheerness Dockyard Church – Hugh Broughton Architects
- Sidcup Storyteller – DRDH Architects for London Borough of Bexley
- Student Hub, Queen's Business School Belfast – TODD Architects
- The Discovery Centre (DISC) – Herzog and de Meuron / BDP for AstraZeneca
- The Old Byre – Gianni Botsford Architects for Joseph Kohlmaier
- Triangle House – Artefact
- Young V&A – AOC Architecture and De Matos Ryan for Victoria & Albert Museum

=== 2026 ===
The following buildings won a National Award in 2026:

- A House and Garden at Fairmead – Sergison Bates architects
- Arding & Hobbs – Stiff + Trevillion for W.RE
- BEAM Hertford – Bennetts Associates for East Hertfordshire District Council
- Bristol Beacon – Levitt Bernstein for Bristol City Council and Bristol Music Trust
- Canada Water Plot K1 – Morris+Company with White Ink for British Land
- Harold Moody Health Centre – Morris+Company for London Borough of Southwark and Notting Hill Genesis
- Heritage Quad: York Minster Centre of Excellence – Tonkin Liu Architects for York Minster
- Highbury House & Studio – Maich Swift Architects
- Iorram – Baillie Baillie Architects
- Kepax Footbridge – Moxon Architects and Jacobs (engineering) for Worcestershire County Council
- Lion Green Road – Mary Duggan Architects (design) with RUFF Architects (delivery) for Brick by Brick
- Norton Folgate – Allford Hall Monaghan Morris, Stanton Williams, Morris + Co, DSDHA and East for British Land
- Paddington Square – Renzo Piano Building Workshop with Adamson Associates for Great Western Developments Ltd with Sellar Property Group
- Pantybara – Rural Office for Niall and Helen Maxwell
- Pembroke, Mill Lane – Haworth Tompkins for Pembroke College, Cambridge
- Plant – Feilden Clegg Bradley Studios with Grant Associates, Twelve Architects and Studio Knight Stokoe for Mactaggart Family & Partners with Longstock Capital
- Plashet Road Newham – Levitt Bernstein for London Borough of Newham
- Rammed Earth House – Tuckey Design Studio
- River Wing, Clare College, Cambridge – Witherford Watson Mann Architects for Clare College, Cambridge
- Sadler's Wells East – O'Donnell + Tuomey for Sadler's Wells and London Legacy Development Corporation
- House on a Hill – David Kohn Architects for Crispin Kelly
- Space House – Squire & Partners, Atelier Ten, Pell Frischmann, Donald Insall Associates, Gustafson Porter + Bowman, Gardiner & Theobald and BAM for QuadReal and Seaforth Land
- Technology Hub: York Minster Centre of Excellence – Tonkin Liu Architects for York Minster
- The Apple House – Okra for The Serge Hill Project & Tom Stuart-Smith Studio
- The Brentford Project - Phase 1 – Allford Hall Monaghan Morris, Howells and Maccreanor Lavington for Ballymore
- The Featherstone Building – Morris+Company for Derwent London
- The Richard Cairns Building, Brighton College – KRFT Architecture studio & Nicholas Hare Architects for Brighton College
- The Tannery – Coffey Architects for London Square
- Tollymore – McGonigle McGrath
- UCL East, Marshgate – Stanton Williams for University College London
- UCL One Pool Street – Lifschutz Davidson Sandilands for University College London
- Urban Nature Project, Natural History Museum – Feilden Fowles and J&L Gibbons for Natural History Museum, London
