= MacQuarrie Edge =

Location of MacQuarrie Edge Coats Land, Antarctica

MacQuarrie Edge (80°32′S 30°3′W) is a rock scarp rising to about 760 metres (2,500 ft) in the northern part of the Otter Highlands, in the western Shackleton Range, Antarctica. It was named by the UK Antarctic Place-Names Committee after Alister S. MacQuarrie (1935–1970), a British Antarctic Survey tractor mechanic at Halley Station, 1968–69, who worked in the Shackleton Range.
