= Clarkson Cliffs =

Clarkson Cliffs (80°28′S 27°4′W) are ice-covered cliffs marked by rock exposures, rising to 1,400 metres (4,600 ft) at the northeast edge of Fuchs Dome, Shackleton Range. They were photographed from the air by the U.S. Navy, 1967, and surveyed by the British Antarctic Survey (BAS), 1968–71. They were named by the UK Antarctic Place-Names Committee after Peter D. Clarkson, BAS geologist, Halley Research Station, 1968–70, who worked in the area for four seasons, 1968–71, 1977–78; Head, BAS Mineralogy, Geology and Geochemistry Section, 1976–89; at Scott Polar Research Institute from 1989.
