= Clayton Ramparts =

The Clayton Ramparts (80°44′S 27°25′W) are a line of east–west cliffs rising to over 1,600 metres (5,200 ft) at the southern margin of Fuchs Dome, Shackleton Range. They were surveyed by the Commonwealth Trans-Antarctic Expedition, 1957, photographed from the air by the U.S. Navy, 1967, and further surveyed by the British Antarctic Survey (BAS), 1968–71. They were named by the UK Antarctic Place-Names Committee after Charles A. Clayton, BAS surveyor, Halley Research Station, 1969–71, who worked in the area.
