= Peter Barber =

Peter Barber may refer to:

- Peter J. Barber (1830–1905), American carpenter and architect in Santa Barbara, California
- Peter Barber (architect) (born 1960), British modernist architect
