= Emperor Bay =

Bay in Antarctica

Coordinates: 75°32′S 26°52′W

Emperor Bay was a small bay on the Brunt Ice Shelf due west of Halley Station. It was so named by the Royal Society International Geophysical Year expedition because of the emperor penguin colony on the fast ice in the embayment during 1956. The expedition's base was a few miles eastward (1955–59) on the Brunt Ice Shelf.
