= Halley Bay =

Important Bird Area in Antarctica

Coordinates: 75°32′17″S 27°24′19″W

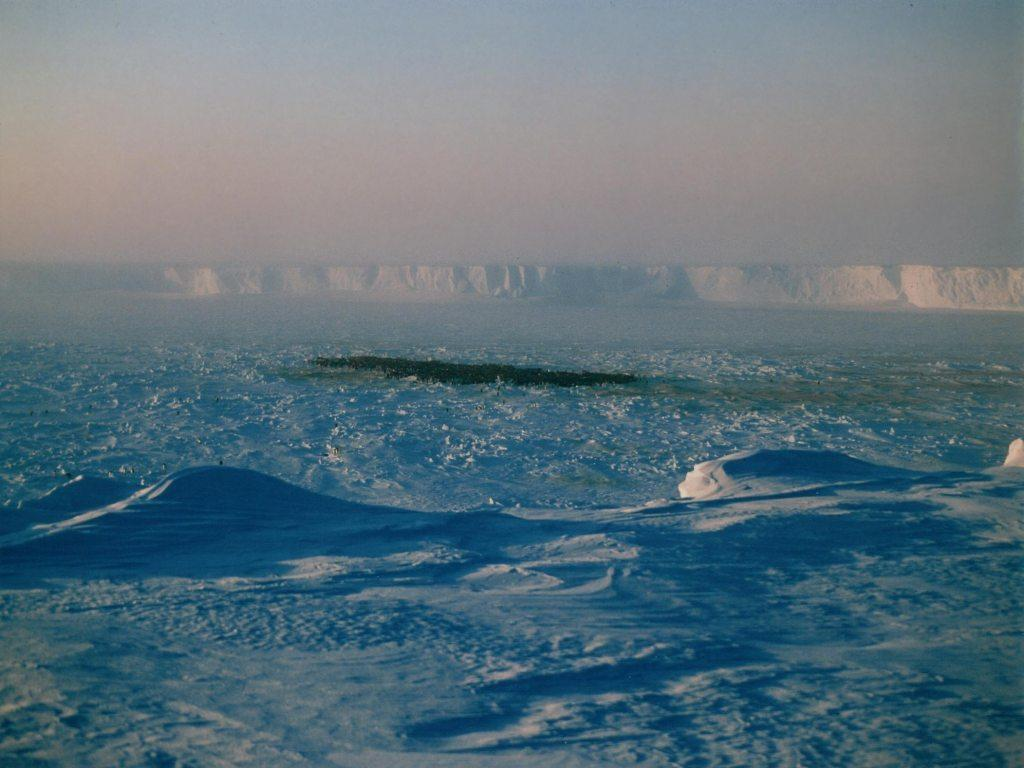
The Halley Bay emperor penguin colony in 1999

Halley Bay was a location on the fast ice on the north-western margin of the Brunt Ice Shelf in Coats Land, Antarctica. The series of British Halley Research Stations were constructed near here and named after the bay. The original ice bay was transitory and no longer exists although other bays in the same area keep reforming and breaking off as the shelf calves into icebergs. The location contains a 177-hectare (440-acre) site which has been designated an Important Bird Area (IBA) by BirdLife International because it supported a breeding colony of about 22,500 emperor penguins (estimated from 2009 satellite imagery) although as of 2019 the colony has dispersed due to repeated failure of the sea ice. In addition to the recent seasonal failures of ice the Brunt Ice Shelf is approaching a large calving event which will reshape this section of coast and leave the original location of Halley Bay many kilometers out at sea.
