= McDonald Ice Rumples =

- Ice rise McDonald Ice Rumples (Antarctica)
- Interactive map of McDonald Ice Rumples
- Ocean: Southern Ocean

The McDonald Ice Rumples (75°28′S 26°18′W) constitute an ice rise in the Brunt Ice Shelf bordering the Weddell Sea in Antarctica, covering an area of 3 by 2 nautical miles (6 by 4 km).

Ernest Shackleton's Imperial Trans-Antarctic Expedition reported a glacier in this vicinity in January 1915. It was named "Allan McDonald Glacier" after Allan McDonald of the British Association of Magallanes at Punta Arenas, who was chiefly responsible for raising funds for sending the schooner Emma on the third attempt, in July 1916, to rescue the 22 men of the Endurance left on Elephant Island.

The Royal Society International Geophysical Year expeditions occupied Halley Research Station nearby (1955–59) and were familiar with this feature, reporting in 1957 that the maximum elevation above the general surface of the ice shelf, a few hundred metres from the ice front, was about 18 metres (60 ft). It has now been identified with "Allan McDonald Glacier" and, for the sake of historical continuity, the UK Antarctic Place-names Committee has given the name McDonald to these ice rumples.

== See also ==
- McDonald Bank
