= Feilden Fowles =

Architectural firm based in London

Fergus Feilden and Edmund Fowles
- Occupation: Architect
- Practice: Feilden Fowles
- Buildings: The Fratry Project (2019) The Weston (2018); New student accommodation and college facilities, Green Templeton College (2017); New dining hall, Homerton College (2017); Waterloo City Farm (2017); Feilden Fowles’ Studio (2016); Fitzjames Teaching and Learning Centre (2014); The Rose Building (2014) The Lee Centre (2013)
- Website: www.feildenfowles.co.uk

Feilden Fowles is an architectural firm based in London. It was formed in 2009 by Fergus Feilden and Edmund Fowles, who first collaborated while studying at the University of Cambridge. The practice has been recipient of several awards including Young Architect of the Year 2016. Alongside practice, Feilden Fowles has taught a studio unit at Sir John Cass School of Art, Architecture and Design, London Metropolitan University since 2015.

== Significant buildings ==
- (2024) - The garden of the Natural History Museum, London, UK
- (2020)(on site) – The Fratry Project, Carlisle Cathedral, Carlisle, UK
- (2020)(appointed) – Central Hall, National Railway Museum, York
- (2019) – The Weston at Yorkshire Sculpture Park, West Yorkshire, UK
- (2018) Charlie Bigham's Food Production Campus, Dulcote, Somerset, UK
- (2017)(appointed) – New student accommodation and college facilities, Green Templeton College, University of Oxford, Oxford, UK
- (2017)(appointed) – New dining hall, Homerton College, University of Cambridge, Cambridge, UK
- (2017) – Waterloo City Farm, a community resource created on an infill site owned by Guys and St Thomas’ Trust
- (2016) – Feilden Fowles’ Studio, Waterloo, London, UK
- (2014) – Fitzjames Teaching and Learning Centre, Hazlegrove Preparatory School, Yeovil, Somerset, UK
- (2014) – The Rose Building, Ralph Allen School, Bath
- (2013) – The Lee Centre, Ralph Allen School, Bath

== Awards ==
- (2019) RIBA Stirling Prize shortlist, The Weston
- (2019) RIBA National Award and RIBA Yorkshire Building of the Year, The Weston
- (2018) RIBA South West Awards Building of the Year, Charlie Bigham’s Food Production Campus (Phase 1)
- (2018) RIBA London Award Winner, Waterloo City Farm
- (2017) Wood Awards Small Projects Winner, Feilden Fowles Studio
- (2017) – RIBA London Award Winner
- (2016) – BD Young Architect of the Year Winner
- (2015) – RIBA Regional Award Winner (Fitzjames and Hazlegrove)
- (2015) – AIA UK Young Architects of the Year Winner
- (2015) – Civic Trust National Award Winner The Lee Centre, Bath
- (2014) – RIBA National Award Winner, The Lee Centre, Bath
- (2010) – Grand Designs Finalist Eco-house of the Year, Ty Pren, Powys

== Teaching and examining ==
- Sir John Cass School of Art, Architecture and Design, London Metropolitan University, studio unit, since 2015
