= Biba Dow =

British architect

Biba Dow (born 9 July 1969 in London) is a British architect and architectural assessor. She co-founded Dow Jones Architects in 2000 with Alun Jones and is a director and partner at the firm. Dow Jones Architects has produced a wide-ranging body of work, much of which has been published in international architectural publications, mainstream publications and has been featured in several exhibitions.

She is a member of the Cathedral Fabric Committee at Coventry Cathedral, the Royal Borough of Kensington and Chelsea Design Review Panel and the Old Oak and Park Royal Design Review Panel.

== Education and career ==
Biba Dow studied architecture at the University of Cambridge where she received her Bachelor's degree in architecture (1988 - 1991) and MA Dip.Arch (Cantab) (1992 - 1994). After graduating in 1994, Dow worked for the architectural practice Powell and Moya. In 2000, she co-founded Dow Jones Architecture with her husband Alun Jones where she continues to practice.

== Work ==
=== Architectural and urban practice ===
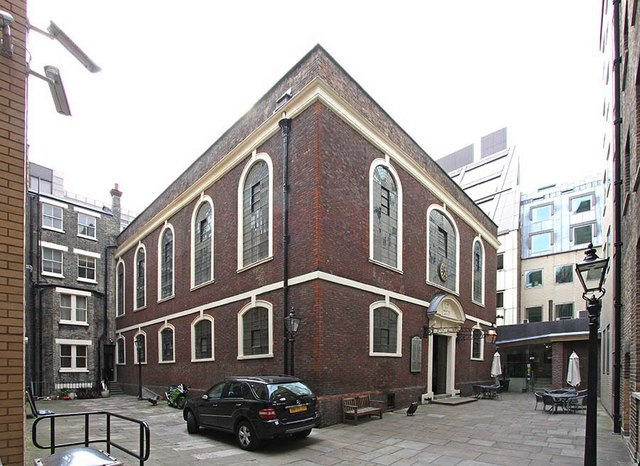
Bevis Marks Synagogue before Dow Jones Architects' rebuild of the annexe to the synagogue

Dow Jones Architects' work ranges from strategic planning projects to museum and gallery projects and private residences. Having worked with clients from the private, public, and commercial sectors including the GLA, Design for London, and Tate Britain, they have won numerous awards including the RIBA National Award in 2009 and 2021.

Dow has led many projects including Grand Junction at St Mary Magdalene, Paddington, which involved an extension to a listed church and the introduction of more open access, a café, and performance space, the redevelopment of Bevis Marks Synagogue, and restoration and redevelopment of the crypt at Christ Church, Spitalfields. She has also led a number of public regeneration and research projects for the GLA including Rubbish In, Resources Out, an award-winning strategic design report investigating urban waste treatment facilities in London.

Today, Dow and Jones remain actively engaged as design and project leaders, but lead projects individually. Dow has cited architect couples like Charles and Ray Eams, the Smithsons, and Lucienne and Robin Day as her inspiration for founding a practice with her partner and as models for combining creative practice with living and working together.

=== Other involvements ===
Dow lectures and writes on the work of her practice and on wider cultural ideas, and has been involved with teaching and examining throughout her career. She has written about architecture and culture in publications including Drawing Matter, the Architecture Foundation and Architects' Journal.

A theme in much of her written work and lectures is the reconsideration of resources use in construction and the ethical professional responsibilities of architects in the face of climate change. Through her involvement in initiatives such as the GLA's Rubbish In, Resources Out, and events such as Building on the Built, which focuses on architectural work connected with existing structures, and Architect@Work (London 2020), which centred around the intersection of design and architecture with nature, Dow has emerged as a leading architectural figure in the new movement in urban environmental policy and circular economies.

Dow has also taught at various UK universities, is an external examiner and teaches a diploma unit at the Cass, and has been a visiting critic at Cambridge University, the Kingston School of Art, and other schools. She is also a governor of a primary school in Brixton.

She is a member of the Cathedral Fabric Committee at Coventry Cathedral, the Royal Borough of Kensington and Chelsea Design Review Panel and the Old Oak and Park Royal Design Review Panel. In 2025 she became a trustee of the Architecture Foundation.

== Notable projects ==
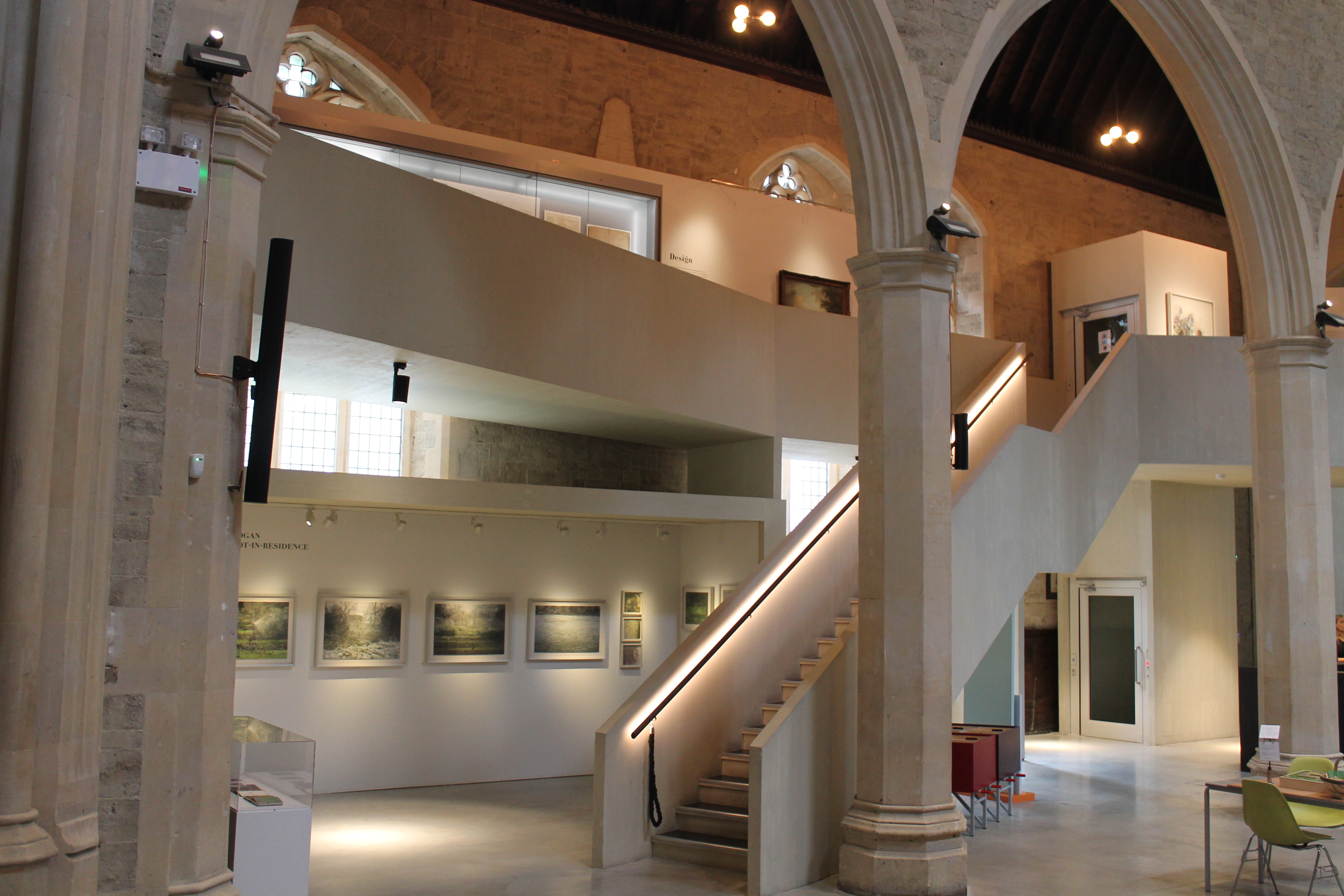
The Garden Museum, designed by Dow Jones Architects and completed in 2007

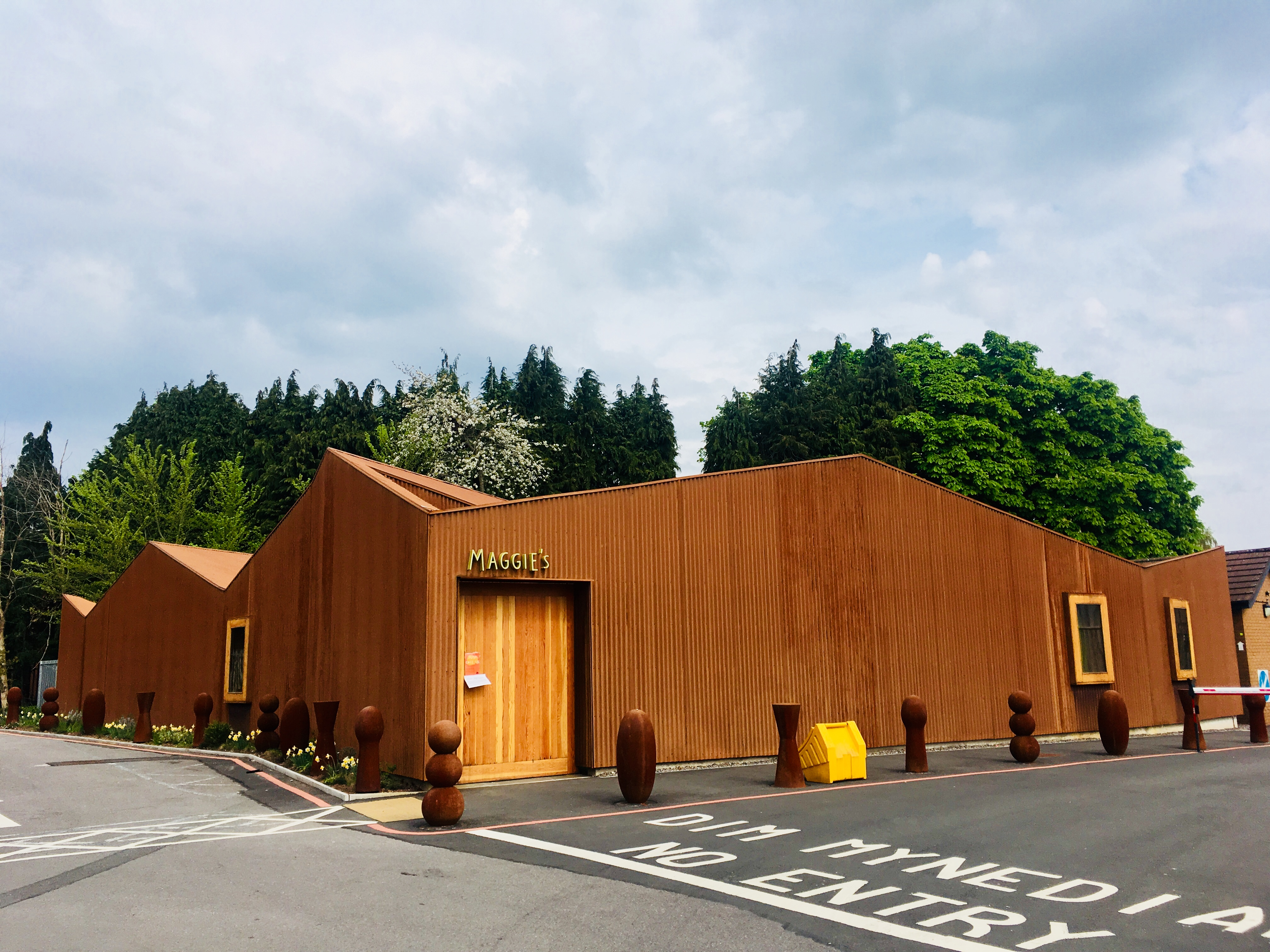
Maggie's Centre, Cardiff, completed 2019

- Garden Museum, London (2007)
- Christ Church Spitalfields, London (2010)
- Grand Junction at St Mary Magdalene, Paddington, London (2016)
- Maggie's Centre, Cardiff (2019)
- Bevis Marks Synagogue, London (2022)

== Lectures and seminars ==
- 2015 - "Rubbish In, Resources Out" (lecture, Producing Waste/Producing Space, Princeton, NJ, March 7, 2015).
- 2019 - "Uncertainty" (lecture, Architecture Friday Lecture, 8 February 2019.)
- 2022 - "Quiet Marvels" (seminar, Online talks on sacred space: Presence, Person, Beauty, December 8, 2022.)

== Publications ==
- Dow and Alun Jones. "Metamorphosis: Thoughts on emerging into a world of professionalism." In Defining contemporary Professionalism edited by Alun Jones, Rob Hyde. London: RIBA Publishing, 2019.
- Biba, Dow. "Six Architects on Their Dream Desks." Drawing Matter, 17 December 2019.
- Biba, Dow. "Biba Dow: Profession’s failure to embrace retrofits is a macho hangover of Modernism." Architects' Journal, 20 January 2020.
- Biba, Dow. "Biba Dow on Giorgio Morandi: Group and Threshold." Drawing Matter, 3 March 2020.
- Dow and Alun Jones. "B for Building." In An Alphabet of Architectural Models, edited by Olivia Horsfall Turner, Simona Valeriani, Matthew Wells and Teresa Fankhänel, London and New York: Merell, 2021
- Biba, Dow. "Survey: Piazza Grande, Gubbio, Prugia." Drawing Matter, 18 August 2021.
- Biba, Dow. "Dalibor Vesely: Shared Horizons." Drawing Matter, 8 August 2022.

== Awards and honours ==
- 2021 – RIBA National Award, Maggie's Centre
- 2021 – RSAW Welsh Architecture Award, Maggie's Centre
- 2020 – BD Public Building Architect of the Year Award
- 2020 – RICS Social Impact Award, Maggie's Centre
- 2020 – Civic Trust Award, Maggie's Centre
- 2019 – National Eisteddfod Plaque of Merit, Maggie's Centre
- 2018 – Architects Journal Retrofit Award, Museums & Galleries, Garden Museum
- 2018 – Woman Architect of the Year (Finalist)
- 2018 – Civic Trust Award, Garden Museum
- 2016 – Architects Journal Retrofit Award, Listed Buildings Under £5m, Christ Church Spitalfields
- 2015 – RIBA Isle of Wight Award, Best New Build, The Sett
- 2013 – RIBA London Regional Awards, Tanners Hill
- 2010 – Lighting Design Award, East Central Gallery
- 2010 – BD Refurbishment Architects of the Year, East Central Gallery
- 2010 – BD Refurbishment Architects of the Year, Lant Street
- 2010 – BD Refurbishment Architects of the Year, Prospect House
- 2010 – BD Refurbishment Architects of the Year, Christ Church Spitalfields
- 2009 – RIBA Research Award, Rubbish In, Resources Out
- 2007 – Brick Award, Poplar Cottage
