= Proctor & Matthews =

British architectural practice

Proctor and Matthews Architects are a British architectural practice based in London, UK.

Proctor and Matthews have completed buildings in a number of different sectors. Projects include the Greenwich Millennium Village and Abode in Harlow, which won a Royal Institute of British Architects Award in 2005. The practice has also designed the Gorilla Kingdom at London Zoo, a building for the University of Brighton in Hastings and Abode at Great Kneighton in Cambridgeshire - a mixed-use community containing over 300 homes. In addition, Horsted Park - a mixed-use development by the practice in Kent - was named Housing Project of the Year in the 2013 Building Awards.

Awards for Abode at Great Kneighton include the Supreme Winner at the Housing Design Awards 2014, a Civic Trust Award and the National Panel Special Award at the Civic Trust Awards 2015 and a RIBA Regional Award 2015. The RIBA East Awards also named Proctor and Matthews Architects as Architect of the Year and named Abode at Great Kneighton as Building of the Year. Abode at Great Kneighton won a RIBA National Award in June 2015.
