= McDonald Bank =

- Submerged bank McDonald Bank (Antarctica)
- Interactive map of McDonald Bank
- Ocean: Southern Ocean

McDonald Bank (75°30′S 26°35′W) is a submarine bank in the Weddell Sea named in association with the McDonald Ice Rumples. The name was proposed by Dr. Heinrich Hinze of the Alfred Wegener Institute for Polar and Marine Research, Bremerhaven, Germany, and was approved by the Advisory Committee for Undersea Features in June 1997.
