= Hugh Broughton (architect) =

English architect

- Born: Hugh Giles Keyworth Broughton; February 1965 (age 61); Worcester, England
- Occupation: Architect
- Awards: BD Architect of the Year 2024 - Creative Conservation Architect of The Year Architizer A+ Awards 2024 - World’s Top Small Architecture Firm (Public Choice) BD Architect of the Year 2023 - Public Building Architect of the Year BD Architect of the Year 2012 - International Breakthrough Architect of the Year
- Practice: Hugh Broughton Architects
- Buildings: 2025 The Discovery Building, Rothera Research Station, Antarctica; 2023 Redevelopment of the Dockyard Church, Royal Navy Dockyard, Isle of Sheppey, Sheerness, Kent, England; 2022 Clifford's Tower, York, England; 2019 The Painted Hall, Old Royal Naval College, Greenwich, London, England; 2017 Henry Moore Studios & Gardens; 2016 The Portland Collection, The Harley Gallery; 2015 Institution of Structural Engineers; 2013 Halley VI Research Station, Antarctica; 2012 Juan Carlos I Antarctic Base, Antarctica; 2005 British Council Malaysia; 1998 South Wimbledon District Guides
- Website: https://hbarchitects.co.uk/

Hugh Giles Keyworth Broughton (born February 1965 in Worcester) is an English architect and one of the world's leading designers of polar research facilities. His practice, Hugh Broughton Architects, founded in 1995 and based in London, works internationally. The practice has won several high-profile international design competitions, including Halley VI Research Station, Juan Carlos 1 Spanish Antarctic Base, the Atmospheric Watch Observatory in Greenland for the US National Science Foundation, a new health facility on Tristan da Cunha, the world's most remote inhabited island, and the redevelopment of Scott Base for Antarctica New Zealand, designed in collaboration with New Zealand firm Jasmax.

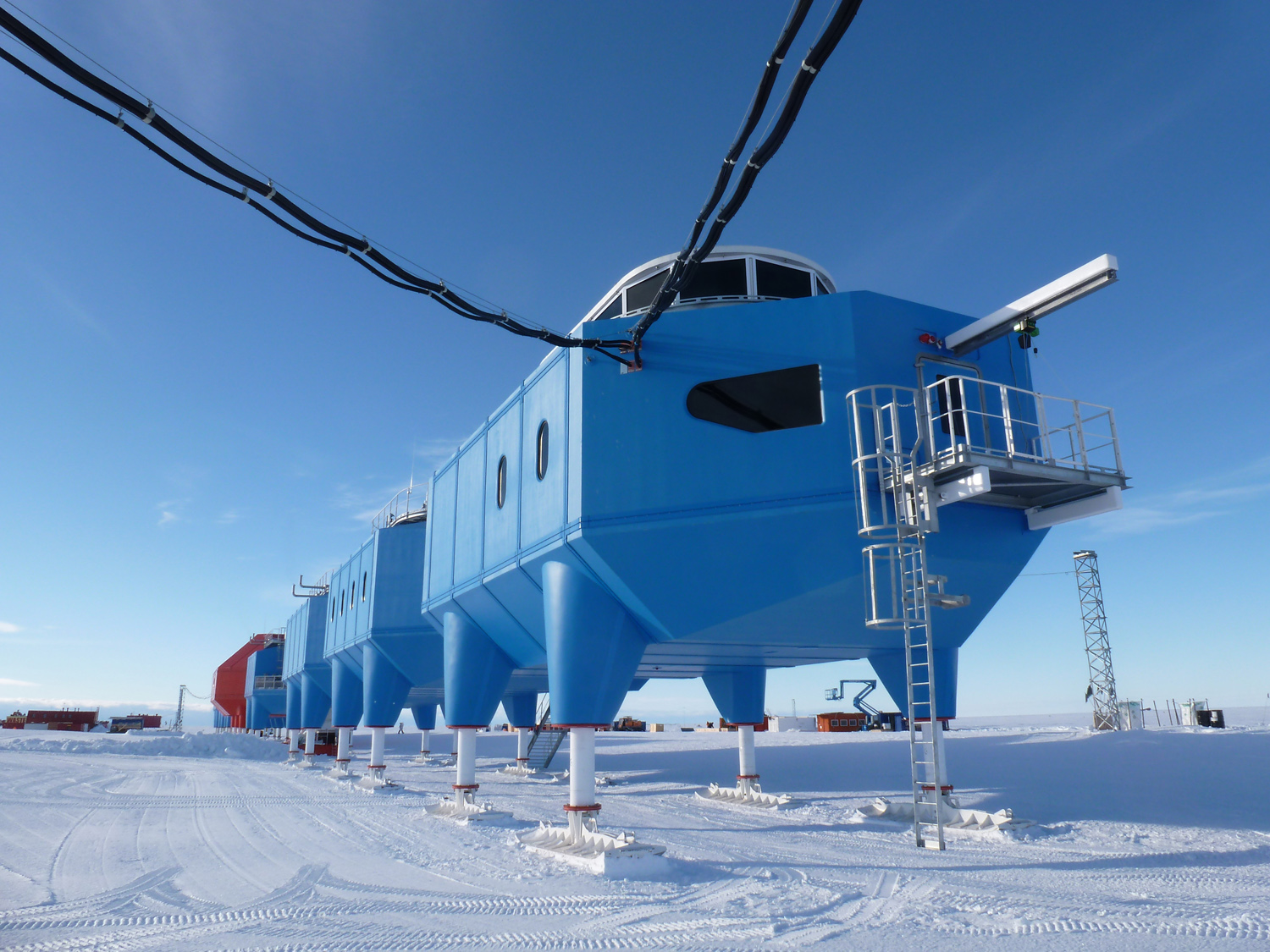
Halley VI Research Station designed by Hugh Broughton Architects for British Antarctic Survey.

As of 2025, current polar work includes the modernisation of the Rothera Research Station for the British Antarctic Survey, and a series of significant projects with the Australian Antarctic Division. In addition to polar expertise, Hugh's practice also specialises in creative conservation - working with institutions to revive and reimagine key heritage buildings. In 2019 the practice completed the conservation of the Grade I listed Painted Hall in the Old Royal Naval College, Greenwich, designed by Sir Christopher Wren in 1696, and has since gone on to complete significant projects at Clifford's Tower in York for English Heritage, and has converted the ruins of the fire damaged Sheerness Dockyard Church. Other notable recent works include the international competition winning design to provide a prototype for archaeological shelters at the World Heritage Site of Nea Paphos in Cyprus, and comprehensive renovation of Westminster City Council's underground toilet network across eight key sites. In 2025 Hugh Broughton Architects were announced as the lead architects for a once in a generation renovation of the Palm House at Royal Botanic Gardens, Kew.

The practice has received five RIBA National Awards, one RIBA International Award (2013), and several RIBA Regional Awards for individual projects. Other awards include those from the Civic Trust, Architects' Journal, Dezeen and the AIA. The practice itself has been recognised with the BD International Breakthrough Architect of the Year Award, 2012, Public Building Architect of the Year Award, 2023, Creative Conservation Architect of the Year, 2024, as well as being voted the World's Top Small Architecture Firm in the Architizer A+ Awards 2024, by public vote. Hugh lectures internationally and has served on numerous architectural juries including the 2013 RIBA Manser Medal, the 2014 AJ Retrofit Awards, the 2015 RIBA Awards and the Architizer Awards; he is an assessor for the Civic Trust Awards. He was named on the Evening Standard The Progress 1000: London's most influential people 2018 - Visualisers: Architecture.

== Outside of Architectural Practice ==
In addition to architectural practice Hugh is an active member of several groups related to the sectors of the profession in which his practice works. These groups include the UK Antarctic Heritage Trust, of which he is a trustee, SpaceArchitect.org, of which he is a member, and the Civic Trust Awards, of which he is a member. Hugh is a regular contributor to professional journals and has authored chapters in the best-selling book Antarctic Resolution, edited by Giulia Foscari. During the 1990s Hugh moved to Spain with his wife Melanie Ashton, and the pair undertook the commission to produce the guidebook Madrid: A Guide to Recent Architecture which was published by Ellipsis in 1997.

From 2018 to 2022 Hugh and his team at Hugh Broughton Architects collaborated with Bristol-based artists Ella & Nicki and emerging practice Pearce+ on their project Building a Martian House. For this he translated the artists' ambitions into an authentic architectural prototype, installed for the public in Bristol, that made extensive use of community outreach and specialist input from scientists and universities.

In 2024 Hugh collaborated with the fashion designer Rick Owens on the design of a remote ski refuge, inspired by Charlotte Perriand's Le Refuge Tonneau. A prototype of the refuge was used as the backdrop to Owens' 2024 runway show for a collection with Italian fashion brand Moncler and presented at their event Moncler Genius in Shanghai, China. The event, which featured several other designers, musical performances and attended by 8000 guests plus 57million viewers online, is reported to be the largest single fashion event of all time.

== Education ==
- 1990 BA MA (Hons) Dip Arch, Architecture, University of Edinburgh

== Significant buildings ==
- 2025 The Discovery Building, Rothera Research Station for the British Antarctic Survey
- 2023 Redevelopment of the Dockyard Church, Royal Navy Dockyard, Isle of Sheppey, Sheerness, Kent, England
- 2022 Clifford's Tower, York, England
- 2019 The Painted Hall, Old Royal Naval College, Greenwich, London, England
- 2017 Henry Moore Studios & Gardens, Perry Green, Hertfordshire, England
- 2016 The Portland Collection, The Harley Gallery, Welbeck Estate, Nottinghamshire, England
- 2015 Institution of Structural Engineers
- 2013 Juan Carlos I Antarctic Base on Livingston Island
- 2013 Halley VI Research Station for the British Antarctic Survey
- 2012 Maidstone Museum East Wing
- 2012-ongoing Atmospheric Watch Observatory at Summit Station on the apex of the Greenland ice sheet for the US National Science Foundation
- 2005 British Council Malaysia
- 1998 South Wimbledon District Guides
- 1996-2018 TUC Congress House, London, England

== See also ==
- British Antarctic Survey
- Congress House
- Greenland ice sheet
- Halley VI Research Station (competition winning design)
- Harley Gallery and Foundation
- Institution of Structural Engineers
- Henry Moore Foundation
- Juan Carlos I Antarctic Base
- Livingston Island
- Maidstone Museum & Art Gallery
- Old Royal Naval College
- Scott Base
- Sheerness Dockyard
- Summit Station
- US National Science Foundation
- Venice Biennale of Architecture
