= Wyeth Heights =

Rock heights in Antarctica

Wyeth Heights (80°45′S 29°33′W) is a rock heights rising to 1,335 m at the head of Blaiklock Glacier, forming the southeast extremity of Otter Highlands in western Shackleton Range. The feature was surveyed by the Commonwealth Trans-Antarctic Expedition in 1957 and was photographed from the air by the U.S. Navy in 1967. It was further surveyed by the British Antarctic Survey (BAS) from 1968 to 1971. It was named by the United Kingdom Antarctic Place-Names Committee (UK-APC) after Robert B. Wyeth, a BAS geologist on Stonington Island from 1971 to 1973 who worked in the Shackleton Range in 1971.
