= Cindy Walters =

Australian architect

Dr Cindy Walters
- Born: 17 June 1963 (age 62)
- Occupation: Architect
- Awards: AJ Woman Architect of the Year Award
- Practice: Walters & Cohen
- Buildings: Bedales School (Hampshire); Colston's Girls' School (Bristol); Shirley Sherwood Gallery of Botanical Art (Kew Gardens); KwaZulu Natal Society of Arts (Durban, South Africa)
- Website: www.waltersandcohen.com

Cindy Walters (born 1963) is an Australian architect and partner at Walters & Cohen in London, England.

She studied in South Africa before moving to London in 1990 where she worked at Foster & Partners. Walters & Cohen was established in 1994 with Michál Cohen.

== Notable Appointments ==
Walters & Cohen were appointed to design exemplary school prototypes for Tony Blair's Department for Education and Skills in 2003 and the Scottish Government's Scottish Futures Trust in 2012.

== Notable Awards ==
In 2012, Cindy Walters and Michál Cohen together received the Architects' Journal inaugural Woman Architect of the Year Award. When presenting the award, the judge emphasized the "consistent quality of their architecture, combined with the ethos of the practice," commenting on their "active involvement with the RIBA and in teaching and examining at architecture schools". 70% of the Walters & Cohen's architectural staff were women at the time of the award.

Nominated for the 2022 Mies van der Rohe Award for the Dorothy Garrod Building, Newnham College, Cambridge

RIBA South East Award 2021 and RIBA National Award 2021 for The King’s School, Canterbury International College

Civic Trust Award 2020 for The Dorothy Garrod Building, Newnham College, Cambridge

RIBA National Award 2019, RIBA East Award 2019, RIBA East Building of the Year 2019 for The Dorothy Garrod Building, Newnham College, Cambridge

Civic Trust Award 2018 for Vajrasana Buddhist Retreat Centre

Civic Trust Award 2017 for Regent High School

RIBA London Sustainability Award 2016 for Regent High School

RIBA South Region Award 2013 for new building at Ryde School

Civic Trust Award 2010 for The Shirley Sherwood Gallery of Botanical Art, at the Royal Botanic Gardens, Kew
