= Brunt Basin =

Brunt Basin (75°S 25°W) is a glacially eroded basin of the Brunt Ice Shelf and partially of the Stancomb-Wills Glacier. It was named in association with Brunt Ice Shelf, the name having been proposed by Dr. Heinrich Hinze of the Alfred Wegener Institute for Polar and Marine Research, Bremerhaven, Germany, and approved by the Advisory Committee for Undersea Features in June 1997.
