= Charlie Bigham's =

Brand of fresh ready meals

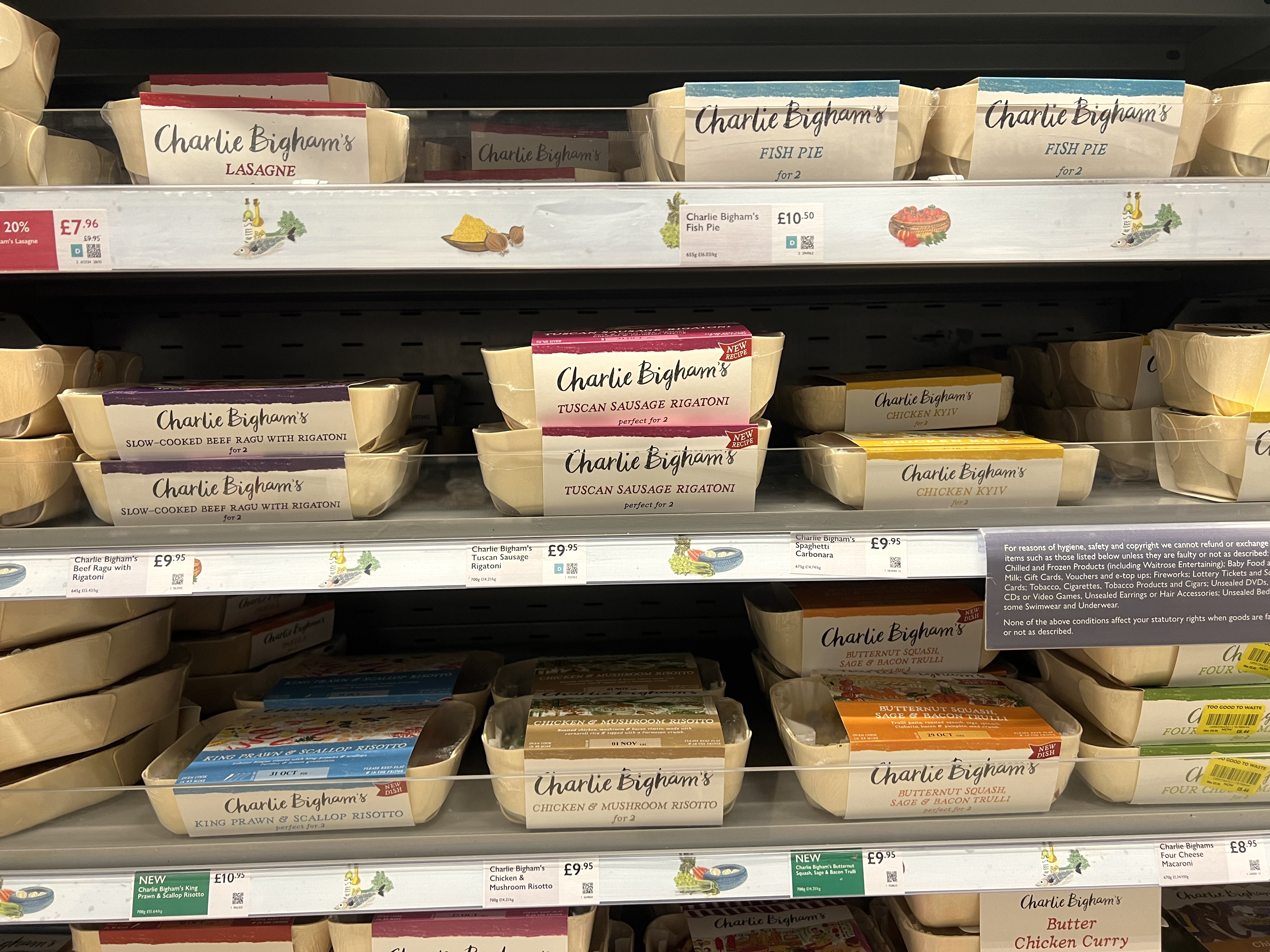
- Founded: 1996; 30 years ago
- Founder: Charlie Bigham
- Area served: United Kingdom
- Key people: Patrick Cairns (CEO); Charlie Bigham

Charlie Bigham's is a British brand of ready meals founded by Charlie Bigham.

== History ==
In 1996, Charlie Bigham, a former management consultant from London, started his namesake business in his own kitchen and selling his prepared meals at his local market. Spurred on by the positive feedback due to his high-quality ingredients, he approached thirteen banks with the fourteenth agreeing to back his business. He would then open the first 500 square foot kitchen in Park Royal, North West London. His first chef he employed called Spike and the business originally supplied a small London deli before expanding and serving high end stores across London. He later remarked of this period: "We had just three product lines to start with - zesty Caribbean lamb, Cajun chicken with salsa, and salmon with a dill and cream sauce. I think we made just 20 meals in total in that first week."

Charlie Bigham 2022

Referencing his early success with shops and delis in the mid-1990s: ""What greatly helped us, is that you have to remember that at the time, most ready - or convenience - meals, as I prefer to call them, were pretty dreadful." Upon reaching his limit with available stores to supply, he would expand to supermarkets. He would then choose to cold-call Waitrose: "I just picked up the phone and rang the Waitrose switchboard. I managed to persuade a lovely woman on the phone to put me through to a buyer. I got a meeting, and the buyer said she would give us a go." The delicatessens of Selfridges and Harvey Nichols, and later Waitrose stocked the meals.

In 2012, Allan Leighton joined the board of directors.

In 2013, Bigham's created "Swish Pie", the world's most expensive ready meal at £314.16, as a publicity stunt. The pie contained lobster, turbot, scallops, smoked salmon and oysters, poached in Dom Pérignon champagne, topped with truffles and a gold leaf crumb, and a side of Beluga caviar.

In 2016, Bigham's bought Dulcote Quarry, a disused quarry in Somerset, to build a new factory after outgrowing its premises in London. The first phase of the food production campus was designed by Feilden Fowles and completed in 2017.

In 2020, Bigham's became a certified B Corporation. By August 2020, annual sales had reached £80 million.

In 2021, Bigham's launched a £3 million advertising campaign, including radio and podcast adverts voiced by Richard Osman.

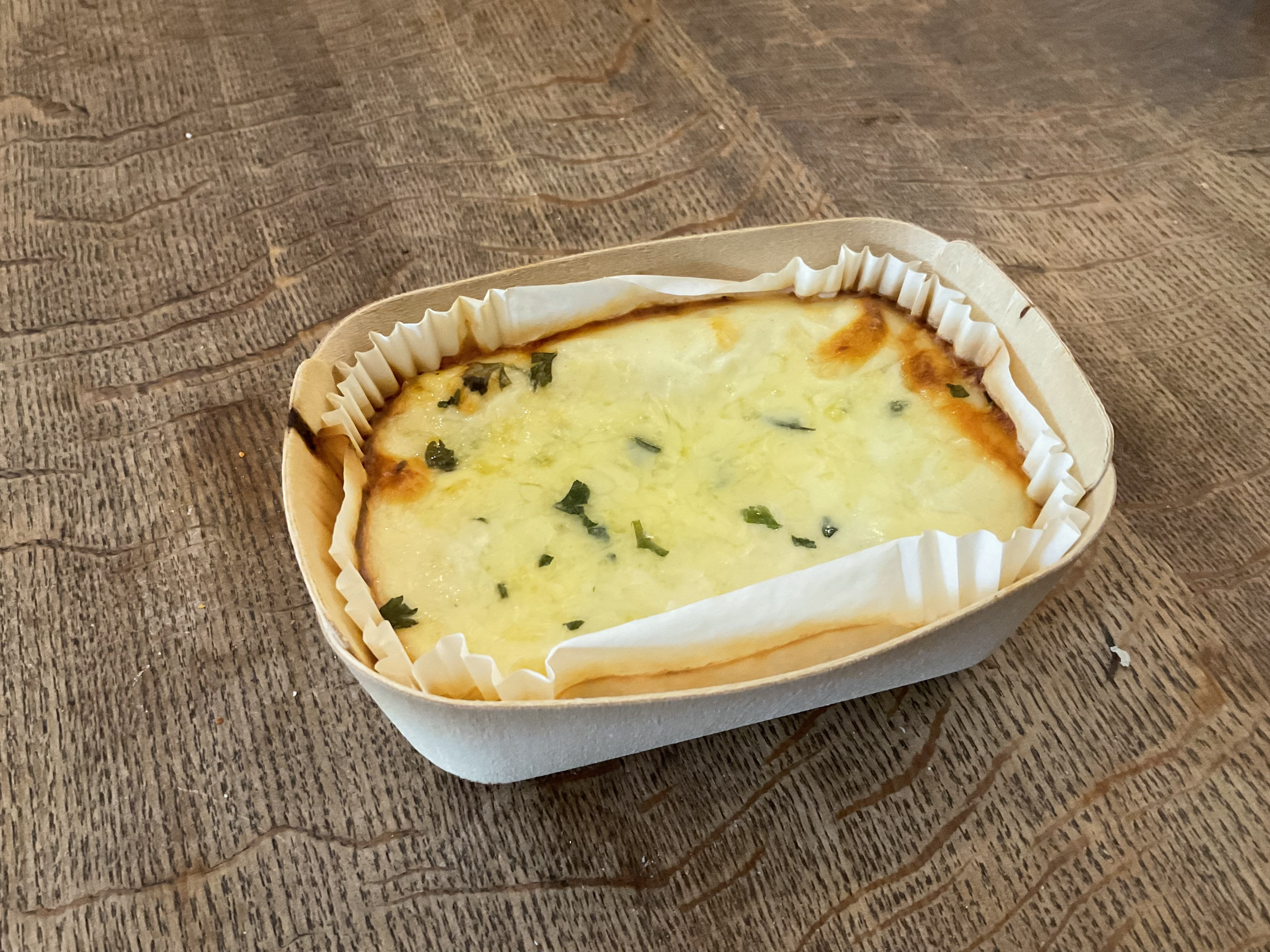
A serving of Charlie Bigham's Lasagna in its wooden container

In an interview with City AM: "Bigham credits his longevity in the game to the brand’s focus on creating a meal that is packed with real ingredients as opposed to preservatives. “We’re providing something which is, in my view, several notches better than a ready meal,” he explains. “That’s why we’re very fortunate that consumers have come with us on that journey and we get a very high repeat rate. People who buy our food tend to buy it quite frequently,” he adds. " He said in 2012 his inspiration was: "Julian Metcalfe, founder of Prêt a Manger and Itsu: both businesses are built around fresh and well prepared food. I value Julian’s passion for producing thoughtfully made deli-style food using natural ingredients, which is very similar to our own ethos."

== Products ==
Bigham's produces dozens of dishes, including lasagne, cottage pie, Shepard's pie, salmon en croûte, steak and ale pie, and beef bourguignon and dauphinoise potatoes. They are intended to be heated or cooked in a conventional, rather than microwave, oven. The packaging, designed by Perry Haydn Taylor's big fish design agency, uses wooden or ceramic heatable containers instead of metal or plastic, although aluminium foil trays were briefly used during a container supply shortage in 2012.

== Reception ==
The Sunday Times restaurant critic Marina O'Loughlin wrote in 2023: "I've never been drawn to this brand – it seemed like a mix of low-rent ready meal and aspirational boujie, invented by someone a bit posh and, um, chinless," but concluded that the lasagne was "delicious".

== Views ==
Bigham has explicitly stated that they are not a ready meal company, he told the Grocer in 2018: "It annoys me, we don’t make ready meals,” the brand's founder insists. “A ready meal is synonymous with compromise. It’s process and price over quality and taste. " He told the i Paper in 2022: “Anyone who says we make ready meals gets their head bitten off,”" He told City AM in 2023: “We don’t make ready meals at all,” Charlie Bigham, founder of the eponymous food tells City A.M, “nothing we make involves a microwave..it’s about making food which is its food to enjoy rather than food as fuel." He would tell the Times in 2024: “I hate ready meals. Ready meals are something you put in a microwave, they’re full of additives and preservatives and they’re not very nice. I set up the business to be not a ready meal. However,” he concedes, “people will quite reasonably say you’re in that sort of category, and it’s a challenge to us.”" He tells the i paper: “I thought everything about ready meals was wrong. I love food, cooking and eating. I set this business up 25 years ago because busy people might not want to cook from scratch, but still want something of quality.”

== Charlie Bigham (Person) ==
Charlie Bigham studied English Literature at the University of Edinburgh, before working as a management consultant at Andersen Consulting and ABL. He also owns the Derreen Estate in County Kerry, Ireland.

In 2013, it was reported that Bigham had insured his senses of sight, smell, taste and touch for £12 million. Under the terms of the insurance policy, he was required to avoid dangers such as tasting hot chillies, piercing his tongue or looking directly at bright light.
