= Otter Highlands =

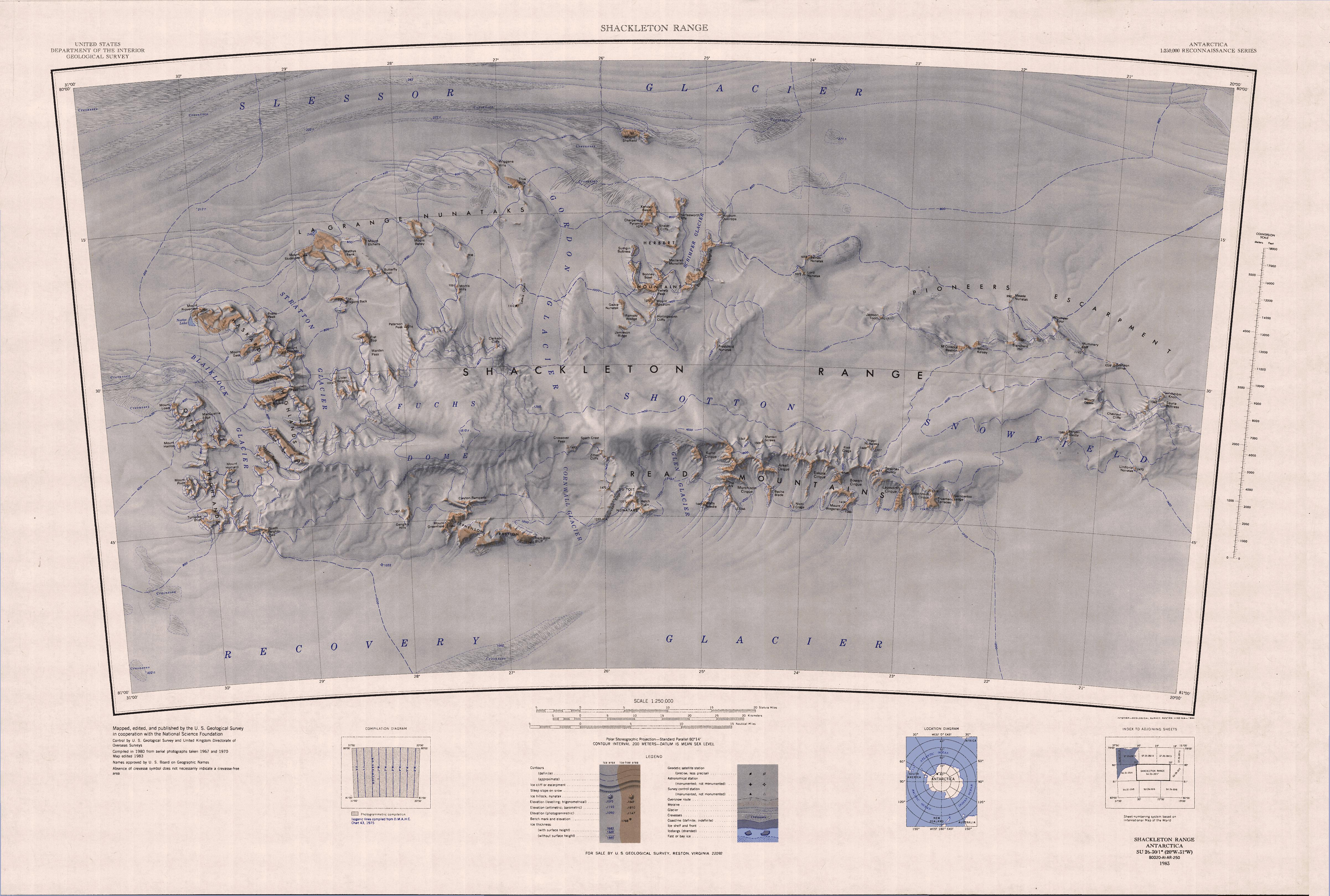
- Shackleton Range. Otter Highlands in the extreme west (left)

Geography
- Location within Antarctica
- Range coordinates: 80°38′S 30°0′W

Otter Highlands (80°38′S 30°0′W) is a group of peaks and ridges in Antarctica extending northwest-southeast for 17 nautical miles (31 km; 20 mi) from Mount Lowe to Wyeth Heights, located west of Blaiklock Glacier and forming the west end of the Shackleton Range. Surveyed by the Commonwealth Trans-Antarctic Expedition in 1957. Named by the United Kingdom Antarctic Place-Names Committee (UK-APC) in 1972 after the De Havilland Otter aircraft which supported the CTAE.

== Features ==
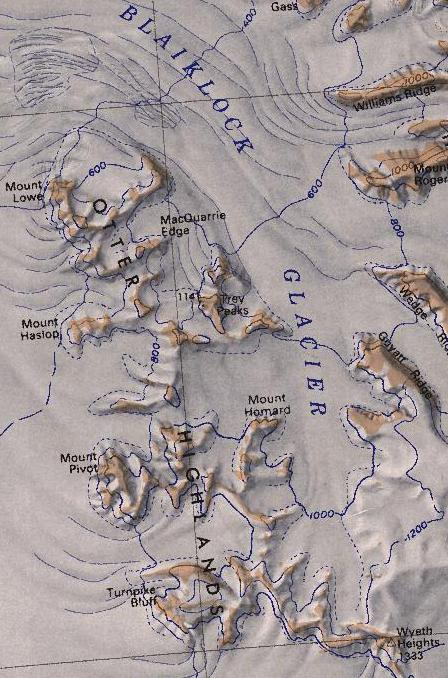
Otter Highlands to the southwest of Blaiklock Glacier

Named features, from north to south:

=== Mount Lowe ===
80°33′S 30°16′W. Mountain having two peaks, the highest 990 metres (3,250 ft), on the south side of the mouth of Blaiklock Glacier in the west part of the Shackleton Range. First mapped in 1957 by the CTAE and named for Wallace G. Lowe, New Zealand photographer with the transpolar party of the CTAE in 1956-58.

=== MacQuarrie Edge ===
80°32′S 30°03′W. A rock scarp rising to c.760 metres (2,490 ft) in the north part of Otter Highlands, western Shackleton Range. Named by the UK-APC after Alister S. MacQuarrie (1935-70), BAS tractor mechanic, Halley Station, 1968-69, who worked in the Shackleton Range.

=== Mount Haslop ===
80°36′S 30°16′W. Mountain, 760 metres (2,490 ft), which stands 2 miles (3.2 km) south of Mount Lowe at the west extremity of Shackleton Range. First mapped in 1957 by the CTAE and named for Right Lt. Gordon M. Haslop, RNZAF (1922-61), New Zealand second pilot of the RAF contingent of the CTAE in 1956-58.

=== Mount Homard ===
80°40′S 29°50′W. Mountain, 1,200 metres (3,900 ft), near the head of Blaiklock Glacier, 2 miles (3.2 km) south of Trey Peaks in the west part of the Shackleton Range. First mapped in 1957 by the CTAE and named for Sgt. Major Desmond E.L. Homard, engineer with the advance party and transpolar party of the CTAE, 1955-58.

=== Mount Pivot ===
80°41′S 30°10′W. Conspicuous mountain, 1,095 metres (3,593 ft), with steep rock slopes on its west side, standing between Mount Haslop and Turnpike Bluff in the west part of the Shackleton Range. First mapped in 1957 by the CTAE and so named because this prominent landmark was the turning point for aircraft and sledging parties of the expedition rounding the southwest end of the Shackleton Range.

=== Trey Peaks ===
80°36′S 28°52′W. Three conspicuous rock peaks, the highest 1,180 metres (3,870 ft). They stand west of Blaiklock Glacier and 2 miles (3.2 km) north of Mount Homard in the west part of Shackleton Range. First mapped in 1957 by the CTAE and given this descriptive name, trey being a term for three used in dice or cards.

=== Turnpike Bluff ===
80°44′S 30°04′W. Conspicuous rock bluff at the southwest extremity of the Shackleton Range, 5 miles (8.0 km) southwest of Mount Homard. First mapped in 1957 by the CTAE and so named because it marks the beginning of a badly crevassed area of Recovery Glacier through which the vehicles of the CTAE had difficulty in passing on their journey from Shackleton Base to the South Pole in 1957.

=== Wyeth Heights ===
80°45′S 29°33′W. Rock heights rising to 1,335 metres (4,380 ft) at the head of Blaiklock Glacier, forming the southeast extremity of Otter Highlands in western Shackleton Range. The feature was surveyed by CTAE, 1957, photographed from the air by the U.S. Navy, 1967, and further surveyed by BAS, 1968-71. Named by the UK-APC after Robert B. Wyeth, BAS geologist, Stonington Island, 1971-73, who worked in the Shackleton Range in 1971.

== Sources ==
- Alberts, Fred G., ed. (1995), Geographic Names of the Antarctic (PDF) (2 ed.), United States Board on Geographic Names This article incorporates public domain material from websites or documents of the United States Board on Geographic Names.
- Shackleton Range, United States Geological Survey, 1983 This article incorporates public domain material from websites or documents of the United States Geological Survey.
