= Wright & Wright Architects =

British architectural firm

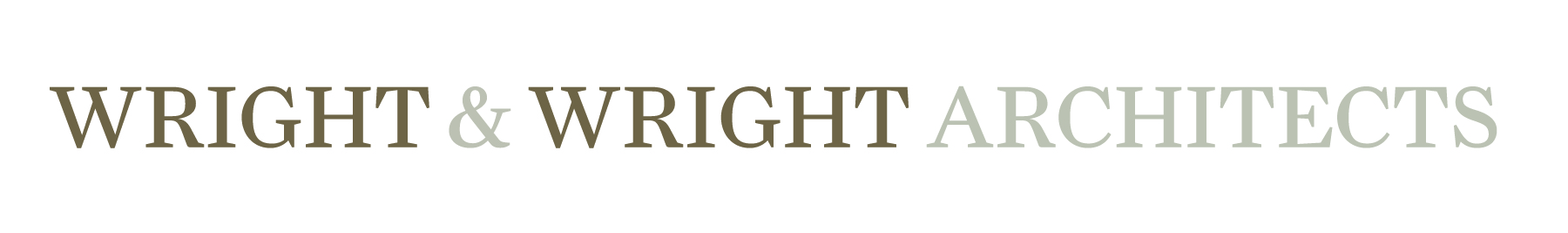

Practice information
- Partners: Clare Wright; Sandy Wright; Stephen Smith; Naila Yousuf
- Founded: 1994
- Location: London

Website
- www.wrightandwright.co.uk

Wright & Wright Architects is a British architectural firm, founded in 1994 by Sandy and Clare Wright MBE. The firm is based in Camden Town, London.

== Background ==
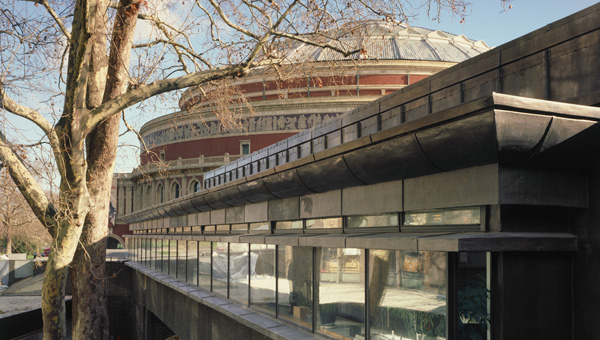
The Royal College of Art Library, London

The practice was founded by Sandy and Clare Wright in 1994. Since winning a competition in 1995 to design the Royal College of Art's library in central London, Wright & Wright have undertaken projects for higher education and culture, including a new library and study centre for St John's College, Oxford, the Longwall Library for Magdalen College, Oxford, and the Women's Library in London. Through this work, the practice has delivered projects for institutions such as the Victoria and Albert Museum, the National Gallery, the Church of England (a library and archive at Lambeth Palace) and the Museum of the Home in London.

== Research ==
Wright and Wright Architects have also worked in fields of research, including design for the elderly, the disabled, and those with special educational needs.
