= Brunt Ice Shelf =

Antarctic ice shelf

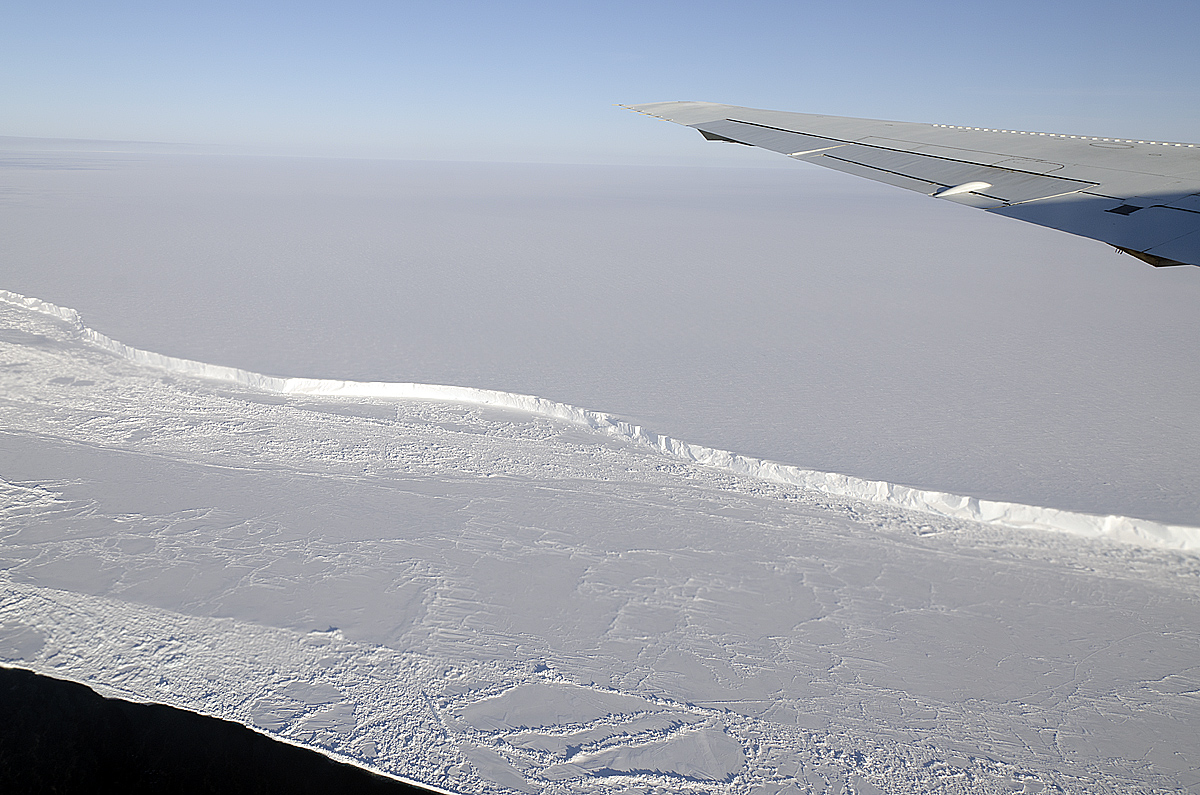
View of Brunt Ice Shelf from the maiden flight of Operation IceBridge's Antarctica 2011 campaign with NASA's DC-8

Location in Antarctica

The Brunt Ice Shelf borders the Antarctic coast of Coats Land between Dawson-Lambton Glacier and Stancomb-Wills Glacier Tongue. It was named by the UK Antarctic Place-names Committee after David Brunt, British meteorologist, Physical Secretary of the Royal Society, 1948–57, who was responsible for the initiation of the Royal Society Expedition to this ice shelf in 1955.

It was the location of the base of the Royal Society Expedition, 1955–59 which was taken over as the British Halley Research Station.

The Brunt Icefalls (75°55′S 25°0′W) extend along Caird Coast for about 80 kilometres (50 mi), where the steep ice-covered coast descends to Brunt Ice Shelf. The icefalls were discovered on 5 November 1967, in the course of a United States Navy Squadron VXE-6 flight over the coast in LC-130 aircraft, and was plotted by the United States Geological Survey from air photos obtained at that time. It was named by the Advisory Committee on Antarctic Names in association with the Brunt Ice Shelf.

== Calving events ==
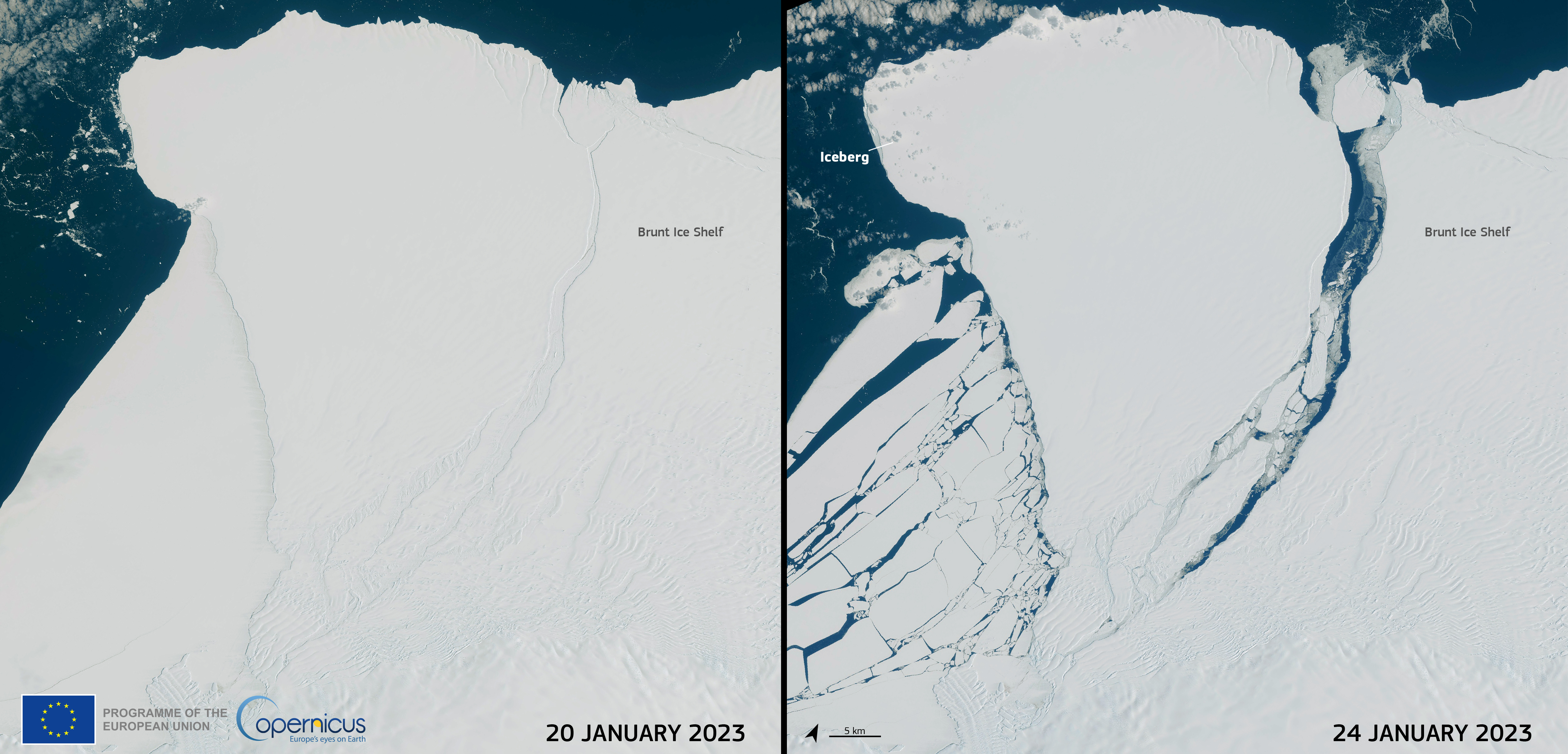
Sentinel-2 satellite imagery shows the before and after the calving in 2023.

In 2012, previously stable large chasms in the ice shelf (cracks which clearly go all the way through to the sea) started expanding, which was expected to cause large parts of the Brunt Ice Shelf to break off within the next few years. On 26 February 2021, the 1,270 km^{2} (490 sq mi) Iceberg A-74 duly broke away from the north-facing shelf, separating from the edge of the shelf at the McDonald Ice Rumples along the North Rift and finally joining the Brunt-Stancomb chasm. As of 28 February, A-74 was located at 75° 13' South, 25° 41' West and measures 30 nautical miles (56 km) on its longest axis and 18 nautical miles (33 km) on its widest axis.

On 23 January 2023, the second major calving from this area occurred when the crack known as Chasm-1 fully extended through the ice shelf, creating a 1,550 km^{2} (600 sq mi) iceberg. Chasm-1 had continued to grow since 2015 and by December 2022 extended across the entire ice shelf, marking the beginning of the calving event.

== See also ==
- Brunt Basin
- Emperor Bay
- List of glaciers
- List of Antarctic ice shelves
- List of Antarctic field camps
