= Peter Barber (architect) =

British architect (b.1960)

Peter Barber OBE RA
- Born: Peter Ambrose Barber; November 1960 (age 66)
- Education: University of Sheffield; Central London Polytechnic
- Occupation: Architect
- Buildings: Mixed-use and residential schemes

Peter Ambrose Barber OBE RA (born November 1960) is a British architect recognised for his work designing social housing. He has been praised for his attempts to address the lack of homeless shelters and social housing provision in a way that aspires to well-designed urbanism.

== Early life ==
Barber is from Surrey. He studied at the University of Sheffield, graduating in 1983, and Central London Polytechnic (now the University of Westminster), graduating in 1986.

== Career ==
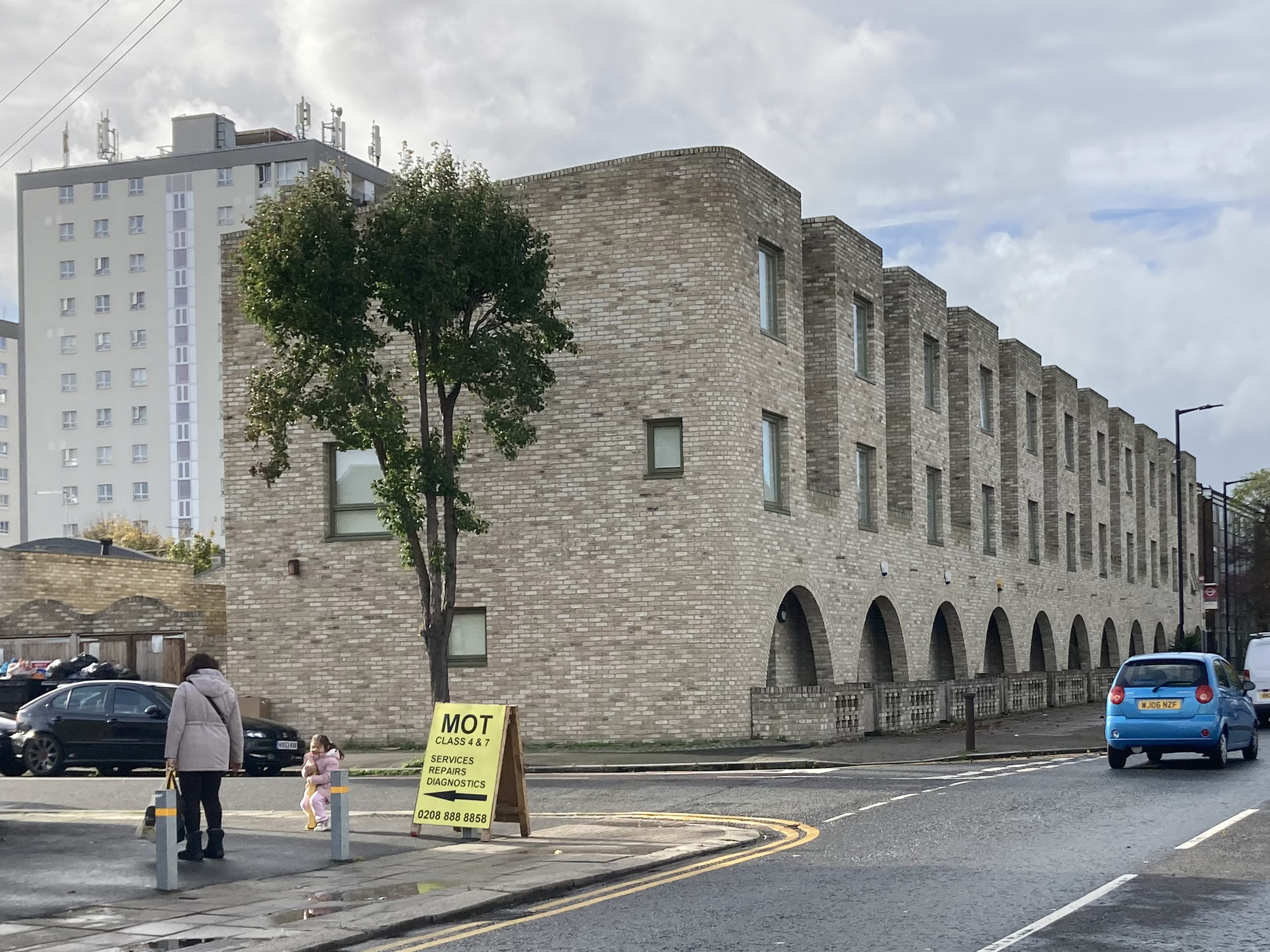
Houses in Enfield designed by Peter Barber

Barber began his career working with Richard Rogers, Will Alsop, and Jestico + Whiles. In 1989, Barber opened Peter Barber Architects, a practice that principally designs mixed-use and urban housing schemes. His studio is housed in a Victorian former printworks shop in Kings Cross.

He is currently a lecturer and reader in architecture at the University of Westminster.

He has presented at numerous events including the Architecture Foundation and Barbican's series Architecture on Stage; the Royal Institute of British Architects; the Architectural League of New York; and international and domestic university schools of architecture including Helsinki, Pretoria, Ahmedabad, Mumbai, Burma, Munich, Genoa, Istanbul and Colombo as well as Oxford University and The Bartlett – University College London.

In 2019, his work was the subject of a major retrospective exhibition at the Design Museum, London.

Barber was one of three selected to be a new Royal Academician at the Royal Academy of Arts (RA) in 2022. He curated the RA's 2023 summer exhibition architecture room. In addition, Barber won the 2022 Soane Medal.

== Philosophy and artistry ==
Barber considers himself left-wing, and his designs have been positively received across the political spectrum. Justin Davidson of New York Magazine described Barber's practice as a "mixture of progressive politics and ye olde urbanism... By training a modernist, by necessity a pragmatist... at bottom a romantic rooted in English scenery and traditions." Barber is an advocate of social housing, against right to buy, and critical of policies that prioritise private development. He has also encouraged revitalising the economies of depopulating cities and towns in the Midlands, North, and on the coast, which would ease housing pressures in addition to creating new jobs and bringing life back into such places.

== Selected awards ==
- 2021 Architects' Journal AJ100 award for an outstanding contribution to architecture
- 2021 Officer of the Order of the British Empire (OBE) for services to architecture in the 2021 Birthday Honours
- 2021 four RIBA National Awards
- 2022 Soane Medal

== Publications ==
- Project Interrupted: Lectures by British Housing Architects, published by the Architecture Foundation, ISBN 9781999646202
