= Halley Research Station =

Antarctic research facility on the Brunt Ice Shelf

- Antarctic base
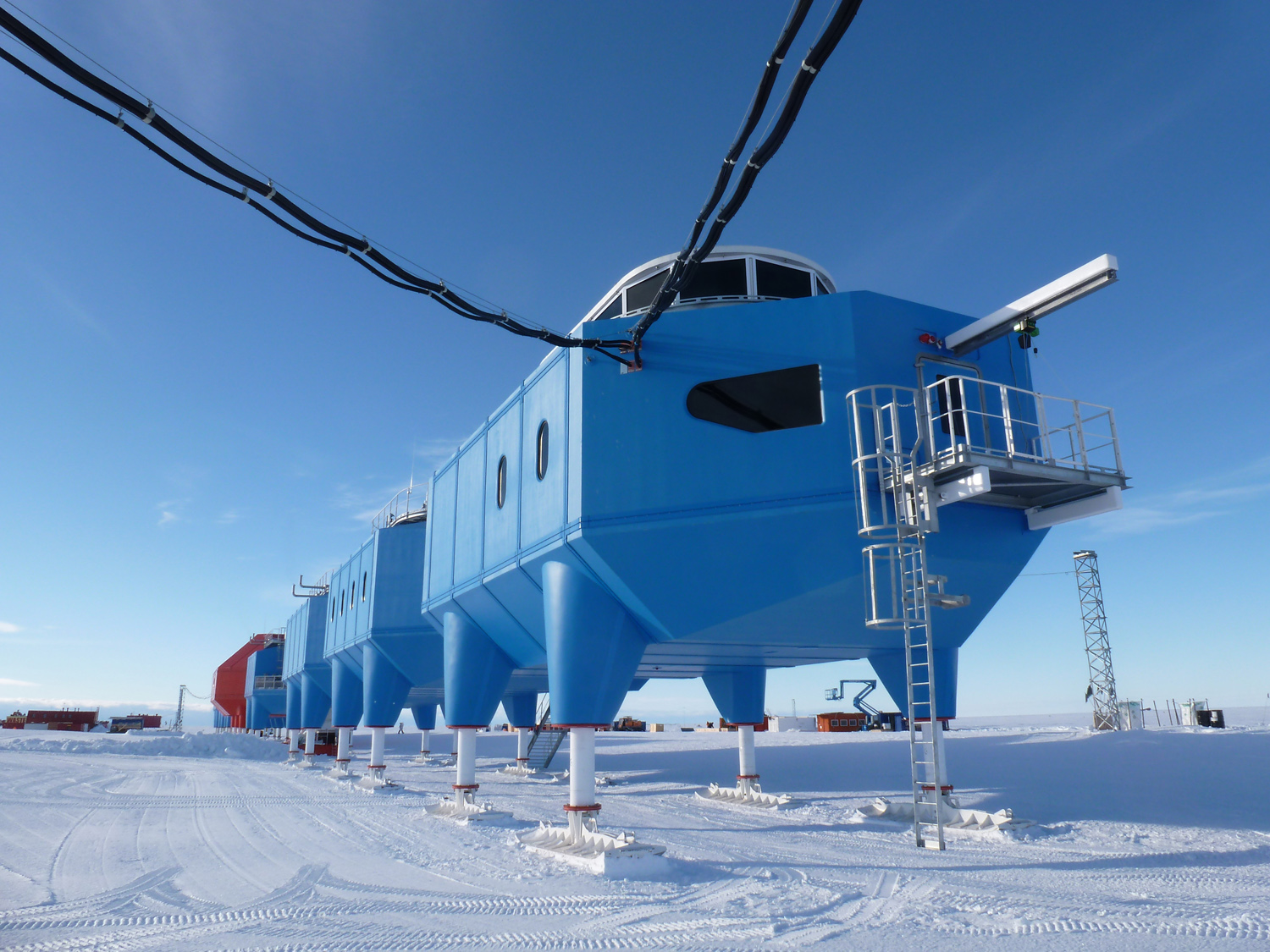
- Halley VI Station

- Location of Halley within Antarctica
- Coordinates: 75°34′05″S 25°30′30″W
- Country: United Kingdom
- British Overseas Territory: British Antarctic Territory
- Location in Antarctica: Brunt Ice Shelf; Caird Coast
- Administered by: British Antarctic Survey
- Established: January 15, 1956
- Named after: Edmond Halley
- Elevation: 37 m (121 ft)

Population (2017)
  - Summer: 70
  - Winter: 17
- UN/LOCODE: AQ HLY
- Type: Seasonal (temporarily since 2017)
- Period: Summer
- Status: Operational
- Activities: List: Earth's atmosphere; Ozone hole
- Website: Halley VI @ bas.ac.uk

Halley Skiway
- IATA: none; ICAO: EGAH

Summary
- Airport type: Private
- Location: Halley Research Station; Brunt Ice Shelf
- Coordinates: 75°35′00″S 26°39′36″W

Map
- Location of airfield in Antarctica

Runways
Direction	Length		Surface
Direction	ft	m	Surface
	1,210	370	Snow

Halley Research Station is a research facility in Antarctica on the Brunt Ice Shelf operated by the British Antarctic Survey (BAS). The base was established in 1956 to study the Earth's atmosphere. Measurements from Halley led to the discovery of the ozone hole in 1985. The current base is the sixth in a line of structures and includes design elements intended to overcome the challenge of building on a floating ice shelf without being buried and crushed by snow. As of 2020, the base has been left unstaffed through winter since 2017, due to concerns over the propagation of an ice crack and how this might cut off the evacuation route in an emergency.

The Halley Bay Important Bird Area with its emperor penguin colony lies in the vicinity of the base.

== History ==
Halley Bay base was founded in 1956, for the International Geophysical Year of 1957–1958, by an expedition from the Royal Society. The bay where the expedition decided to set up their base was named after the astronomer Edmond Halley. Taken over by FIDS (subsequently BAS), it was designated as Base Z. The name was changed to Halley in 1977 as the original bay had disappeared because of changes in the ice shelf.

In 2002, BAS realised that a calving event was possible which could destroy Halley V, so a competition was undertaken to design a replacement station. The current base, Halley VI, officially opened in February 2013 after a test winter. It is the world's first fully relocatable terrestrial research station.

On 30 July 2014, the station lost its electrical and heating supply during record low temperatures (as low as −55 °C (−67.0 °F)), due to coolant leakage. Plans were made to evacuate some of the eight modules and to shelter in the remaining few that still had heat. Power was partially restored 19 hours later, but all science activities, apart from meteorological observations essential for weather forecasting, were suspended for the season.

== The buildings ==
Halley Research Stations
- Halley I: 1956–1967
- Halley II: 1967–1973
- Halley III: 1973–1983
- Halley IV: 1983–1991
- Halley V: 1990–2011
- Halley VI: 2012–present

As with the German Neumayer Station III, the base floats on an ice shelf in the Weddell Sea rather than being built on solid land of the continent of Antarctica. This ice shelf is slowly moving towards the open ocean and, if not relocated, each base would eventually calve off into a drifting iceberg.

There have been five previous bases called Halley. Various construction methods have been tried, from unprotected wooden huts to buildings within steel tunnels. The first four all became buried by snow accumulation and crushed until they were uninhabitable.

=== Halley I ===
- Built: 1956
  - 1956: Main structure
  - 1961: Main living hut
  - 1964: Office block on surface
- Abandoned: 1968
- Structure: Timber hut

=== Halley II ===
- Built: 1967
- Abandoned: 1973
- Structure: A series of wooden huts
  - The roofs were reinforced with steel supports to help support the weight of the snow but the station still had to be abandoned in 1973, after just six years.

=== Halley III ===
- Built: 1973
- Abandoned: 1983
  - In 10 years the base was buried 12–15 m (39–49 ft) below the surface and access and ventilation problems led to its abandonment. Years later it emerged from the ice cliff at the sea.
- Structure: Built inside Armco steel tubing designed to take the snow loadings building up over it

=== Halley IV ===
- Built: 1983
- Abandoned: 1994
- Structure:
  - Two-storey buildings constructed inside four interconnected plywood tubes with access shafts to the surface. The tubes were 9 m (30 ft) in diameter and consisted of insulated reinforced panels designed to withstand the pressures of being buried in snow and ice.

=== Halley V ===
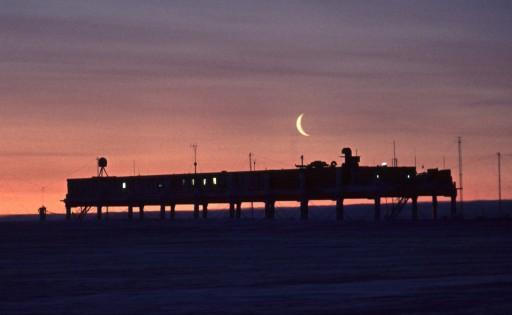
Halley V, Winter 1999

- Built: completed 1990, operational 1989
- Demolished: late 2012
  - Once its successor, Halley VI, was operational, Halley V was demolished.
- Structure:
  - Main buildings were built on steel platforms that were raised annually to keep them above the snow surface.
  - Stilts were fixed on the flowing ice shelf so it eventually became too close to the calving edge.
  - Lawes platform: Main platform
  - Drewry summer accommodation: Two-storey building was on skis and could be dragged to a new higher location each year.
    - The Drewry block was later moved to join the Halley VI base
  - Simpson Building (Ice and Climate Building) (ICB): On stilts and was raised each year to counteract the buildup of snow
    - It housed the Dobson ozone spectrophotometer used to discover the hole in the ozone layer.
  - Piggott platform (Space Science Building): Used for upper atmosphere research.

=== Halley VI ===
Halley VI
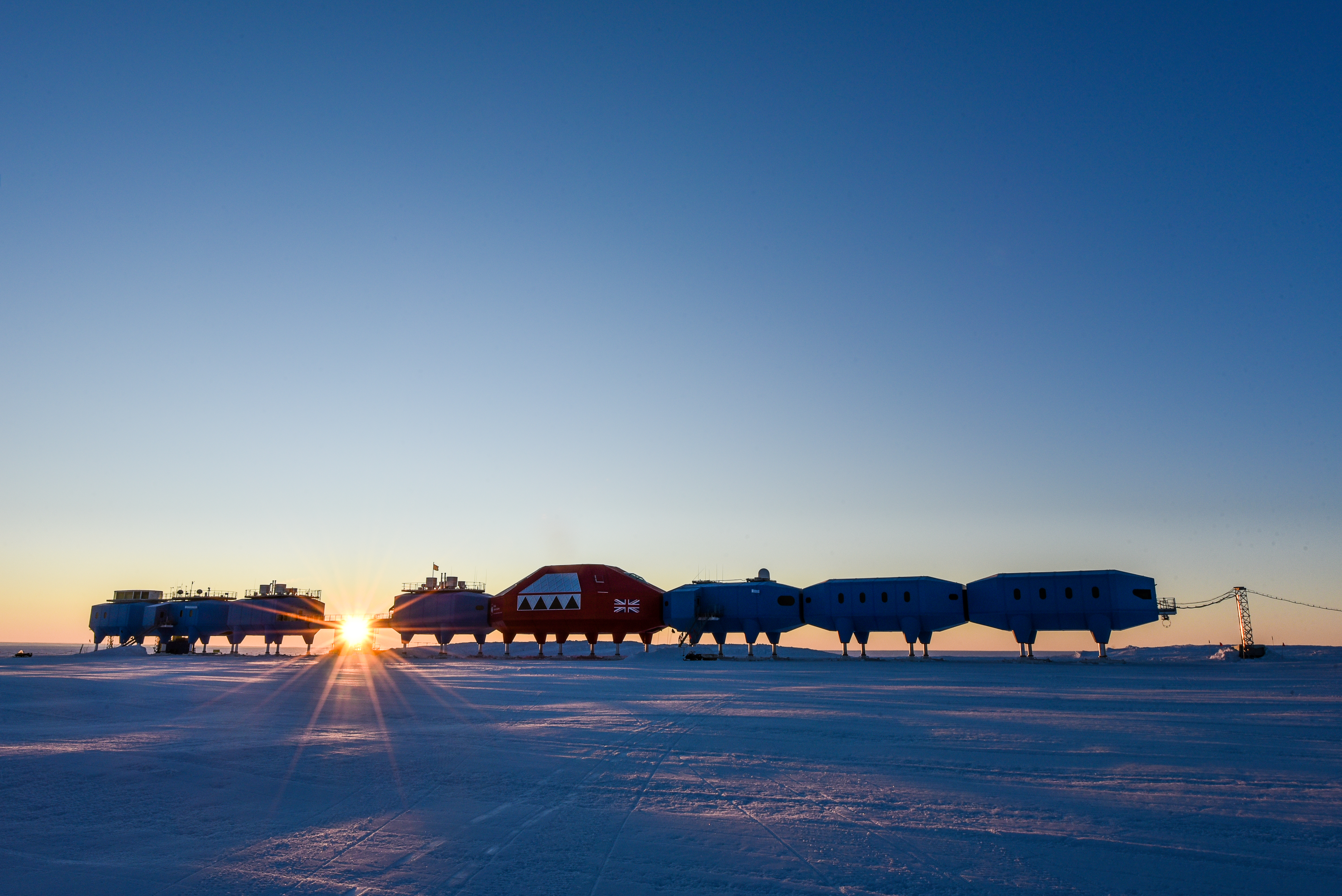
- Halley VI, 2013

General information
- Type: Modular
- Opened: 5 February 2013

Technical details
- Floor area: 2,000 m^{2} (22,000 sq ft)

Design and construction
- Architecture firm: Hugh Broughton Architects
- Developer: British Antarctic Survey (BAS)
- Engineer: AECOM
- Main contractor: Galliford Try

- Built: Over four summers, first operational data 28 February 2012, officially opened 2013.
- Structure: Modular
- Cost: Approximately £26 million

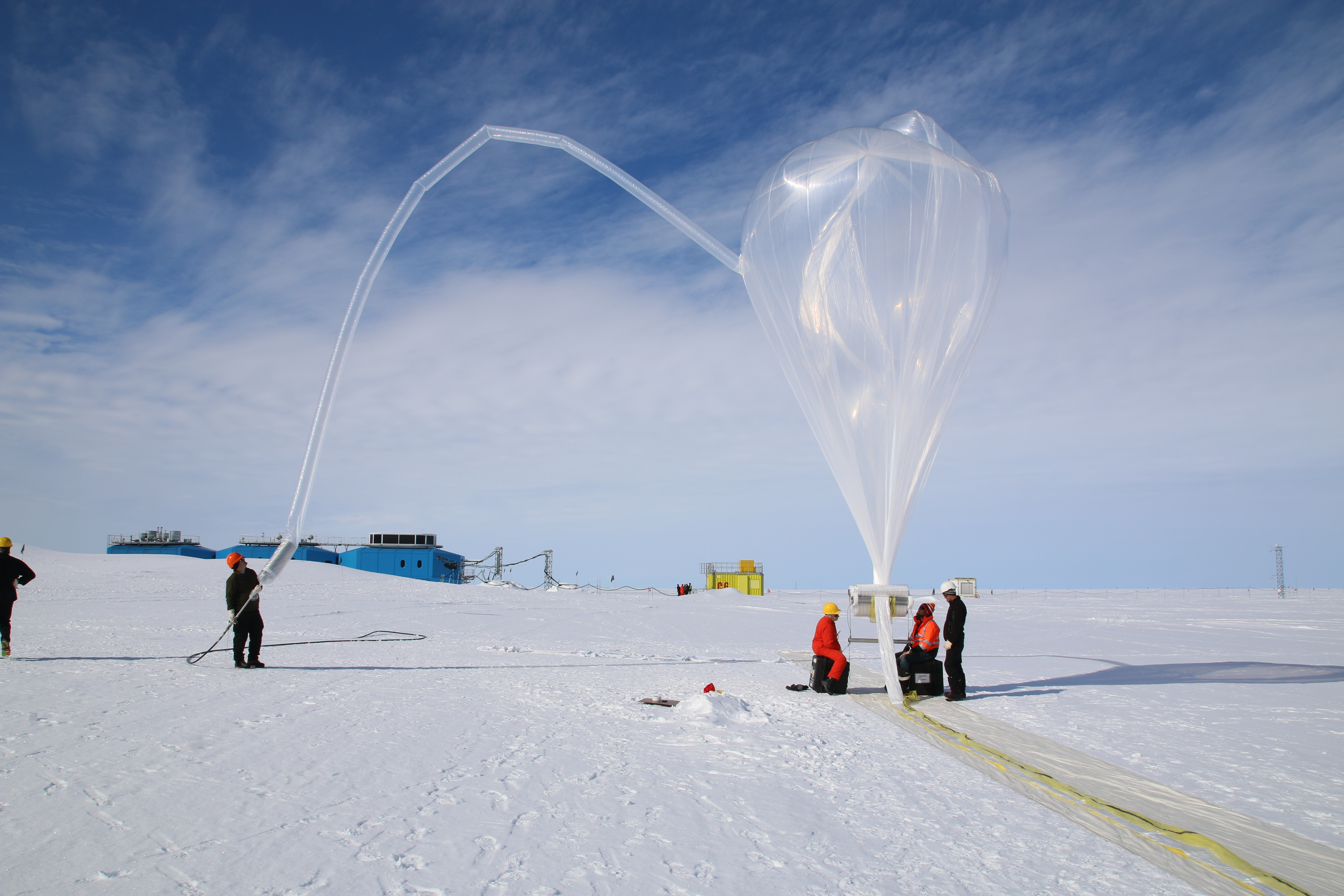
A balloon from NASA's BARREL program begins to rise over the brand new Halley VI Research Station, which had its grand opening in February 2013

Halley VI is a string of eight modules which, like Halley V, are jacked up on hydraulic legs to keep it above the accumulation of snow. Unlike most of Halley V, there are retractable giant skis on the bottom of these legs, which allow the building to be relocated periodically.

The Drewry summer accommodation building and the garage from Halley V were dragged to the Halley VI location and continue to be used. The Workshop and Storage Platform (WASP) provides storage for field equipment and a workshop for technical services. There are six external science cabooses which house scientific equipment for each experiment spread across the site and the Clean Air Sector Laboratory (CASLab) 1 km (0.62 mi) from the station.

==== Design competition ====
An architectural design competition was launched by RIBA Competitions and the British Antarctic Survey in June 2004 to provide a new design for Halley VI. The competition was entered by a number of architectural and engineering firms. The winning design, by Faber Maunsell and Hugh Broughton Architects was chosen in July 2005.

Halley VI was built in Cape Town, South Africa. The first sections were shipped to Antarctica in December 2007. They were assembled next to Halley V, then dragged one-by-one 15 km (9.3 mi) to the intended final location and connected.

Halley VI was officially opened in Antarctica on 5 February 2013. Kirk Watson, a filmmaker from Scotland, recorded the building of the station over a four-year period for a short film. A description of the engineering challenges and the creation of the consortium was provided by Adam Rutherford to coincide with an exhibition in Glasgow.

==== Design elements ====
A focus of the new architecture was the desire to improve the living conditions of the scientists and staff on the station. Solutions included consulting a colour psychologist to create a special colour palette to offset the more than 100 days of darkness each year, daylight simulation lamp alarm clocks to address biorhythm issues, the use of special wood veneers to imbue the scent of nature and address the lack of green growth, as well as lighting design and space planning to address social interaction needs and issues of living and working in isolation.

Another priority of the construction was to have as little environmental impact on the ice as possible.

==== Relocation ====
The BAS announced that it intended to move Halley VI to a new site in summer 2016–2017, prompted by a large crack that had been propagating through the ice and which threatened to cut the station off from the main body of the ice shelf. The station was shifted 23 km (14 mi) from its previous site, the only time the station has been moved since it became operational. Horizon, the long-running BBC documentary series, sent film-maker Natalie Hewit to Antarctica for three months to document the move. Relocation was completed in February 2017.

Whilst the station was being relocated, concerns over another crack (dubbed the "Halloween Crack") emerged. This crack had been discovered on 31 October 2016, and the BAS realised that it too could cut off the station, and possibly make it drift out to sea. Since evacuating the crew is all but impossible during winter, the BAS announced in March 2017 it would withdraw its staff from the base from March to October. Staff returned after the Antarctic winter in November 2017 and found the station in very good condition. The staff have been removed every winter since.

== Climate ==
Climate data for Halley Research Station (extremes 1956–present)
Month	Jan	Feb	Mar	Apr	May	Jun	Jul	Aug	Sep	Oct	Nov	Dec	Year
Record high °C (°F)	7.2 (45.0)	5.3 (41.5)	1.1 (34.0)	−1.5 (29.3)	0.0 (32.0)	−0.5 (31.1)	−5.5 (22.1)	−3.5 (25.7)	−1.1 (30.0)	−0.9 (30.4)	2.2 (36.0)	6.8 (44.2)	7.2 (45.0)
Mean daily maximum °C (°F)	−2.0 (28.4)	−6.7 (19.9)	−12.9 (8.8)	−19.3 (−2.7)	−22.0 (−7.6)	−22.7 (−8.9)	−25.2 (−13.4)	−24.9 (−12.8)	−23.3 (−9.9)	−16.9 (1.6)	−8.9 (16.0)	−2.9 (26.8)	−15.6 (3.9)
Daily mean °C (°F)	−4.8 (23.4)	−9.9 (14.2)	−16.4 (2.5)	−20.2 (−4.4)	−24.2 (−11.6)	−26.7 (−16.1)	−29.2 (−20.6)	−28.2 (−18.8)	−26.2 (−15.2)	−19.5 (−3.1)	−11.7 (10.9)	−5.2 (22.6)	−18.5 (−1.3)
Mean daily minimum °C (°F)	−6.5 (20.3)	−12.4 (9.7)	−19.3 (−2.7)	−26.0 (−14.8)	−29.0 (−20.2)	−29.3 (−20.7)	−31.7 (−25.1)	−31.5 (−24.7)	−30.0 (−22.0)	−23.6 (−10.5)	−14.4 (6.1)	−7.1 (19.2)	−21.6 (−6.9)
Record low °C (°F)	−22.9 (−9.2)	−31.8 (−25.2)	−41.0 (−41.8)	−50.9 (−59.6)	−54.2 (−65.6)	−54.0 (−65.2)	−54.4 (−65.9)	−53.0 (−63.4)	−49.4 (−56.9)	−44.1 (−47.4)	−32.0 (−25.6)	−20.6 (−5.1)	−54.4 (−65.9)
Average relative humidity (%)	82	79	79	78	77	77	70	72	72	76	80	82	77
Mean monthly sunshine hours	251.1	194.9	117.8	45.0	0.0	0.0	0.0	24.8	87.0	204.6	255.0	244.9	1,425.1
Mean daily sunshine hours	8.1	6.9	3.8	1.5	0.0	0.0	0.0	0.8	2.9	6.6	8.5	7.9	3.9
Source 1: Deutscher Wetterdienst
Source 2: Meteo Climat (record highs and lows)

== Inhabitants ==
In the peak summer period, from late December to late February, staff numbers count about 52.

=== Winter crew ===
Before BAS shut down winter operations, there were around 13 overwintering staff. Most were the technical specialists required to keep the station and the scientific experiments running. The 2016 wintering team at Halley included a chef, a doctor, a communications manager, a vehicle mechanic, a generator mechanic, an electrician, a plumber, a field assistant, two electronics engineers, a meteorologist and a data manager. In addition there was a winter station leader who was sworn in as a magistrate prior to deployment and whose main role was to oversee the day-to-day management of the station.

1996 saw the first female winterers at Halley. In 2006, five out of sixteen winterers were women.

== Base life ==
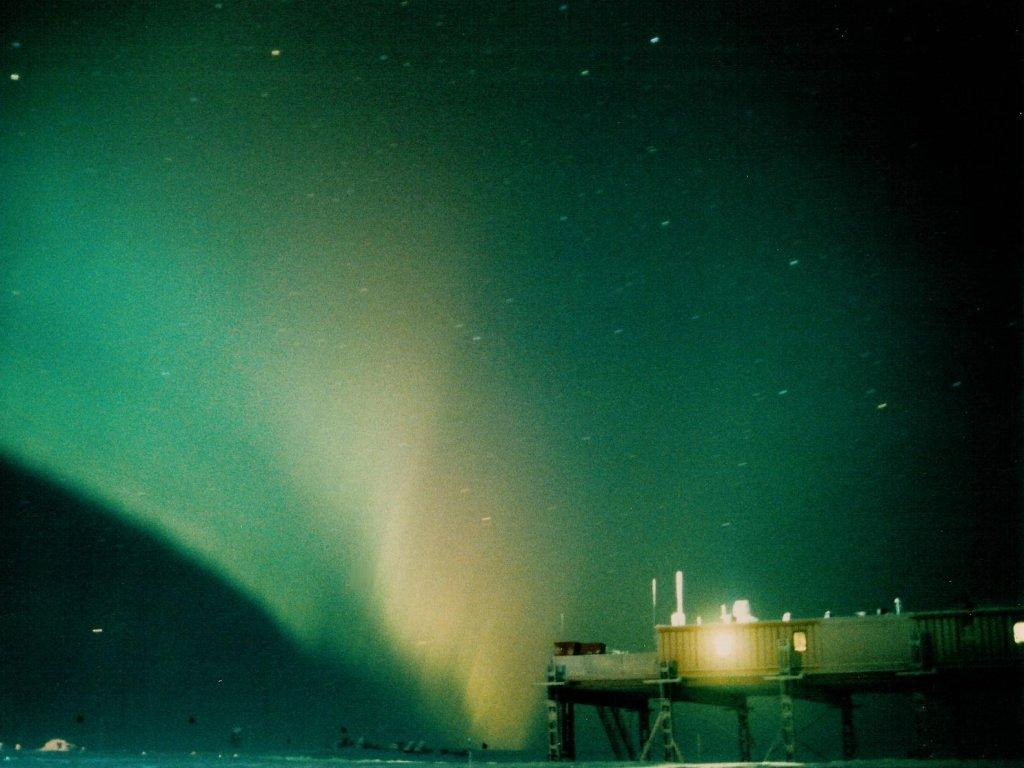
Aurora Australis over Halley V Winter 1998

Life in Antarctica is dominated by the seasons, with a short, hectic summer and a long winter. In bases such as Halley that are resupplied by sea, the most significant event of the year is the arrival of the resupply ship (planned RRS Sir David Attenborough, until 2020 RRS Ernest Shackleton, before 1999, RRS Bransfield) in late December. This is followed by intense activity to unload all supplies before the ship has to leave again; typically, this is done in less than two weeks.

The Halley summer season runs from as early as mid-October when the first plane lands, until early March when the ship has left and the last aircraft leaves, visiting Rothera Research Station before heading to South America.

Significant dates in the winter are sundown (last day when the Sun can be seen) on April 29, midwinter on June 21 and sunrise (first day when the Sun rises after winter) on August 13. Traditionally, the oldest person on base lowers the tattered flag on sundown and the youngest raises a new one on sunrise.

== In popular culture ==
The 2019 movie Where'd You Go, Bernadette ends with footage and animated renderings of Halley VI. The 2013 Scottish Book of the Year 'Empire Antarctica' by Gavin Francis documents a winter spent at Halley.

== See also ==
- List of Antarctic research stations
- List of Antarctic field camps
- List of airports in Antarctica
