= Simon Allford =

British architect (born 1961)

Simon Allford (born July 1961, in Sheffield, UK) is a British architect, and is the co-founder and director of Allford Hall Monaghan Morris (AHMM). He is a past President of the Royal Institute of British Architects (RIBA), and serves as a member of both the Board and Award judging panel. Allford was previously the chair of the board of trustees of The Architecture Foundation (2013-2018), a trustee of the Architectural Association Foundation, and the Vice President for Education at the RIBA. He is currently a trustee at the London School of Architecture and Chickenshed Theatre Trust.

The son of architect David Allford, chair of YRM, Simon Allford was born in July 1961. He attended the University of Sheffield and the Bartlett School of Architecture, where he has since worked as a lecturer. Allford is a visiting professor at the Harvard Graduate School of Design and The Bartlett.

In 1989, with Jonathan Hall, Paul Monaghan and Peter Morris, he established AHMM. The practice today employs over 450 people working on projects in education, healthcare, housing, arts and offices. In 2017, it became majority employee-owned through an employee ownership trust.

AHMM was awarded the RIBA Stirling Prize in 2015 for their design of Burntwood School, in Wandsworth, London. The judging panel said of the project: "Burntwood School demonstrates the full range of the skills that architects can offer to society… It encompasses great contemporary design and clever reuse of existing buildings as well as superb integration of artwork, landscaping and engineering."

In November 2013, it was announced that Allford would be the new chair of the board of trustees of The Architecture Foundation. Allford was elected RIBA President (2021–2023) in August 2020.

== RIBA president ==
In April 2020, Allford criticised the Royal Institute of British Architects in Architects' Journal, describing it as "sadly ever-less relevant", and was subsequently urged by RIBA members to seek election as president and bring about some change at the institute. In August 2020, Allford was elected to be the next RIBA president; serving a two-year term, he succeeded Alan Jones on 1 September 2021. He subsequently said that:

"The RIBA has to focus on where it is useful. ... The members are the ... intellectual powerhouse of the profession, not the institute. ... There is an opportunity to reboot to become smaller, leaner and more agile. The RIBA's efforts were diluted by trying to do everything for everyone."

One of Allford’s priorities as part of his presidency was to increase engagement between the RIBA, its members, and the public. He proposed the creation of a ‘House of Architecture @ RIBA’, an online and physical resource for architecture.

In March 2022, Allford was accused of a conflict of interest after his practice AHMM was shortlisted in a RIBA-organised competition to design a new base for the Maltings Cultural Venue in Berwick-upon-Tweed, Northumberland. A RIBA spokesman said the evaluation process had been managed by Northumberland County Council, and not by the RIBA. "The RIBA president was not involved in any way in the evaluation process, and will not be personally involved in The Maltings project. His direct connection to the RIBA, and the practice’s indirect connection to the RIBA through him, had no bearing on the selection panel’s decision making.". The final outcome of the competition, as confirmed by the Architects' Journal 31 March 2023, was that one of the other shortlisted practices, MICA Architects were successful - "The practice was selected ahead of AHMM, Burrell Foley Fischer, Carmody Groarke and Space Architects in the RIBA Competitions Office-organised search for an architect to oversee the landmark project".

In early April 2022, a RIBA walking tour of London's Barbican Estate was ambushed by residents protesting against AHMM's involvement in a 24-storey tower at Houndsditch, claiming it will cause loss of light to flats and community amenity areas. A leaflet asserted: "Allford used his RIBA position to push forward plans that will blight the lives of Middlesex Street Estate residents in the east of the City."

At his departing address, Allford referenced the ambitions he was able to realise during his presidency, including improving the financial issues at the institution and establishing the House of Architecture.

== Selected works ==
- Angel Building, London
- Tea Factory, London
- Chobham Academy, London
- White Collar Factory, London
- Adelaide Wharf, London
- 6 Pancras Square, London
- 240 Blackfriars, London
- Soho Place, London
- University of Amsterdam, Amsterdam
- Oklahoma City Ballet, Oklahoma
- Oklahoma City Sheriff's Office, Oklahoma
- The Citizen, Oklahoma
