= London School of Architecture =

Architecture school in London, England

Coordinates: 51.5388°N 0.0570°W

- Type: School of architecture
- Established: 2015
- Founder: Will Hunter
- Parent institution: University of the Built Environment
- Students: 120
- Location: London
- Website: the-lsa.org

The London School of Architecture, known as the LSA, is a specialist school within the University of the Built Environment, based in London. Until 2025 it was an independent higher education institution and was England's first independent school of architecture since the Architectural Association opened in 1847.

== History ==
In the October 2011 edition of The Architectural Review, a new think tank called Alternative Routes for Architecture sought to create "a 21st-century apprenticeship, with a reciprocal relationship between practices and students" to tackle a growing crisis in the funding of architectural education. A year later the London School of Architecture emerged from this think tank.

Founded by Will Hunter, the LSA's start-up faculty has been called "a Who’s Who of the respected London architecture world" and includes Deborah Saunt, Clive Sall (co-founder of Fashion Architecture Taste), James Soane (Project Orange), Tom Holbrook, Alan Powers and Peter Buchanan. The Academic Court comprises Nigel Coates, Farshid Moussavi and Leslie Lokko.

Constituted as a charity in 2015, the LSA is supported by philanthropists including Nadja Swarovski, Sir Terry Leahy and Sir Peter Mason and foundations including the Garfield Weston Foundation and the Schroder Foundation. The initial governing board included Crispin Kelly, Sarah Ichioka, Elsie Owusu and Niall Hobhouse.

In May 2025, the LSA merged with the University College of Estate Management in Reading (now the University of the Built Environment).

== Education ==
The LSA offers a two-year postgraduate programme that is validated by the University of the Built Environment and supported by a network of over 200 practices across London. The programme is recognised at Part 2 level by the Royal Institute of British Architects and the Architects Registration Board.

The school opened what it termed a "cost-neutral" education where tuition fees are balanced with placement salaries. The first year of the programme is "divided between study and work, with students spending two days a week on academic projects and the remaining three at an architecture practice, before undertaking a thesis in their final year."

The programme operates ‘Design Think Tanks’, where groups of practices and students collaborate on "speculative design/research around a shared agenda". In 2015, one devised a "new mode of practice for the sharing economy era", while another proposed housing solutions for millennials.

The LSA held its first two graduation shows at Somerset House and published associated magazines: Change in 2017 and Connect in 2018. Student projects engage with political challenges and the urban-scale issues, such as how to deal with waste in the city. In 2019 the LSA launched Citizen magazine with Isabel Allen as its Editor-in-Chief and graphic designer Simon Esterson as Art Director. The magazine engages social, political, urban and architectural subjects and disseminates student work and research. Citizen has been described as the "natural descendent of The Architectural Review and the Real Review: slightly left-field, not afraid to delve into theory or tangential subject matter yet will be interesting to a wider audience."

== Campus ==
The LSA uses "the city as the campus". With the majority of England's architecture schools being based in universities, the LSA has been called "radical" for "sidestep[ping] the notion of the bastion of the university campus [and operating] peripatetically to engage directly with the city".

In its first year, the LSA was based at Second Home and taught at the Design Museum. The school was based at Somerset House in its second and third years and is currently in Hackney. The school sites its design projects in a different London borough each year, starting with Soho in 2015.

Much of the programme is taught in architecture practices around London. For events, the LSA has formed partnerships with leading cultural institutions including the Architecture Foundation, the Design Museum, the London School of Economics, and the Royal Academy of Arts.

== Reputation ==
Described internationally as "possibly the most ambitious" of alternative educational models, the LSA has been connected with "radical" forms of architectural teaching and been said to show how "innovation and high standards are perfectly compatible" and how "beneficial change can be achieved within existing institutional frameworks".

The programme has been credited for influencing the introduction of architecture apprenticeships, and commended for the "level of engagement with the profession in the design of a sustainable and innovative programme" and "the sense of empowerment and independence that the students demonstrate".

One critic found the architecture "a bit prosaic" but "the students are evidently taught to consider the big picture and how the city works" while another said "the founding principles of the LSA are quite revolutionary – but as with all pioneering ideas, only time will prove whether or not it is successful."

The LSA has been linked to other innovative models in arts education, such as Open School East, Islington Mill Academy, Arts Emergency, the School of the Damned and the Silent University.

== Notable members ==
=== Academic Court ===
- Nigel Coates
- Farshid Moussavi
- Leslie Lokko

=== Faculty ===
- Deborah Saunt
- Alan Powers
- Peter Buchanan
- James Soane
- Clive Sall

=== Practice network ===
- Apt
- Assemble
- Allford Hall Monaghan Morris
- Allies and Morrison
- Ash Sakula
- Brady Mallalieu
- Cullinan Studio
- David Chipperfield Architects
- David Kohn Architects
- Eric Parry Architects
- Farrells
- Foster & Partners
- Gensler
- Grimshaw
- Hawkins\Brown
- Haworth Tompkins
- Herzog & de Meuron
- HOK
- Hopkins Architects
- Jestico + Whiles
- John McAslan
- PDP London
- Penoyre & Prasad
- Populous
- Project Orange
- Rogers Stirk Harbour + Partners
- Scott Brownrigg
- Scott Tallon Walker Architects
- Squire & Partners
- Stanton Williams
- Walters & Cohen
- Will Alsop (aLL Design)

=== Partners ===
- Savills
- Stanhope
- Drawing Matter
- Caro Communications
- Kingspan Insulation
