= Independent Transport Commission =

British think tank

- Abbreviation: ITC
- Formation: 1999; 27 years ago
- Type: Charitable organization Public Policy Think Tank
- Chairman Director: Terry Hill; Dr Matthew Niblett
- Website: www.theitc.org.uk

The Independent Transport Commission, abbreviated to ITC, is a research charity and think tank based in the United Kingdom, devoted to exploring issues in the fields of transport, planning and land use. It is politically neutral, and has established a reputation as a nationally respected independent voice on transport and planning policy.

It played a key role shaping policy in the 2000s (decade) with the publication of a series of authoritative and groundbreaking reports on road pricing, suburban planning, long-distance travel, and the future of transport.

The ITC increased its influence to policymakers since 2010 with a series of reports on UK aviation, freight and logistics, paying for roads, and the spatial effects of High-Speed Rail.

The commission delivers its work by publishing reports and policy papers, hosting special lectures and discussion evenings, and meeting with senior officials. The current director is Dr Matthew Niblett, and the chairman of trustees is Terry Hill CBE, also chairman of the Ove Arup Foundation.

== History ==
=== Foundation ===
Following the publication in 1998 of the Labour government's transport white paper entitled 'A New Deal for Transport: Better for everyone', a suggestion was made to Bernard Jenkin MP, the then Conservative Shadow Transport Secretary, that he would benefit from the services of a 'think tank'.

In the event, putting together a think tank to serve the Shadow Secretary of State proved impractical. Many of those approached liked the idea but did not want to serve a political party. This impasse was resolved when, thanks to Professor Mike McDonald, the infant ITC was offered a home by Professor Sir Howard Newby, vice-chancellor of the University of Southampton. The 'Independent Transport Commission', as it was then christened, was formally launched at the Royal Society of Arts in October 1999 with a commitment to be politically independent and to focus on evidence-based research.

=== The New Labour era ===
In 2000 the commission invited Sir Patrick Brown, former permanent secretary to the Department for Transport, to be its chairman. Sir Patrick led the commission through several major projects, encouraging greater boldness in Labour's transport policy, and leading debate on a number of issues. He was succeeded by Dr David Quarmby CBE, who steered the commission through the development of a new Long Distance Travel forecasting model, the first of its kind. In 2009 Quarmby left to lead the RAC Foundation and was succeeded by Simon Linnett, executive vice chairman of Rothschild.

=== The Coalition and Conservative era ===
The election of the Conservative led coalition in 2010 led to fresh opportunities after the spending cuts saw the demise of the government's own transport quango, the Commission for Integrated Transport, leaving the ITC as the main think tank in the field. The ITC's own work on Transport Appraisal and Spending was later submitted to the Transport Select Committee for discussion. With the increased prominence and research output of the ITC Dr Matthew Niblett was appointed as its first director. In 2016 Simon Linnett retired as chairman and was succeeded by Terry Hill CBE.

== Patrons and commissioners ==
=== Patrons ===
- Andrew Adonis, Baron Adonis
- Roger Freeman, Baron Freeman
- Sir Patrick Brown
- Sir Terry Farrell
- Sir Peter Hendy

=== Commission members ===
Terry Hill (chairman), chairman, Ove Arup Foundation; Bridget Rosewell, commissioner, National Infrastructure Commission; Deborah Saunt, director, DSDHA; Kristine Beuret, director, Social Research Associates; Mary Bonar, partner, First Class Partnerships; John Dawson, chairman, International Road Assessment Programme; Nicholas Finney, consultant, UK Port Advisors; Dr Peter Headicar, reader in transport planning, Oxford Brookes University; Dr Stephen Hickey, chairman, Community Transport Association; Professor Peter Jones, Centre for Transport Studies, University College London; Sarah Kendall, independent consultant; Roger Madelin, head of Canada Water Development, British Land; Steven Norris, chairman, National Infrastructure Planning Association; John Worthington, co-founder, DEGW, and director of The Academy of Urbanism

=== Staff ===
- Dr Matthew Niblett, director
- Bright Pryde-Saha, deputy director
- Lucy Kilborn, events

== Activities ==
=== 'Forward Thinking' Discussion Evenings ===
The Independent Transport Commission hosts a regular series of Discussion Evenings at the Alan Baxter Gallery in Farringdon. The commission uses these to develop new policy thinking, and guest speakers at previous events have included Sir David King, Professor Stephen Glaister, Professor Tony Travers and Andrew Haines. Topics explored include: the sharing economy, technology in travel, devolution, education and skills, health and transport, and children and travel.

=== Annual Lecture ===
In 2013 the ITC held the first in a new series of Annual Lectures, exploring the future of transport and travel. These lectures are now a staple in the ITC calendar, and have previously explored the themes of fusion and its feasibility for the future of transport (2013); the fundamental motivations that drive human movement (2014); cities and our transport infrastructure (2015); and how technological advancements will change the way we travel (2016).

== Influence ==
=== Current Projects ===
Road and Rail Travel Trends – This study has been exploring the factors that have been underpinning shifting trends in our travel patterns. The research has involved an attitudinal study as well as mining data from the commercial sector for details of behavioural change, alongside the publication of a number of key reports (see reports list below). This project has been working closely with the Department for Transport, advising them on updating their forecasting models.

Spatial Effects of High-Speed Rail – The ITC's study on the Spatial Effects of High Speed Rail in Britain has had a major impact on the national debate, contributing to a more thorough understanding of the wider benefits that will be afforded by the delivery of HS2. Since the project's inception in Autumn 2012, the ITC has worked closely with city-regions and government departments to move the discussion on HS2 from an engineering/railway project to that of a regeneration project. This was achieved through an ambitious programme of workshops, expert panels, symposia, European and UK study visits, and the publication of a series of detailed reports at high-profile launch events.

Aviation Strategy – The ITC's research on aviation strategy has been complementing that of the Airports Commission by investigating the UK's long-term aviation needs, and the economic and behavioural implications of following different options. The work has been featured heavily in national news outlets such as the BBC and the Financial Times.

Freight and Logistics – This ITC work stream is exploring a number of important challenges, including whether improved intermodal freight operations can provide economic, environmental, and logistical benefits for the UK, as well as how to solve capacity problems and developing more efficient usage of freight networks. Stemming from issues about the collection and use of freight data and statistics raised in its inaugural project report, the ITC has been exploring this issue closely with policy makers and statisticians at the Department for Transport with a view to helping improve the quality of freight data, thereby measuring more accurately the importance of the sector to the UK economy as well as opportunities for efficiency improvements.

=== Previous Projects/Studies ===
Tomorrow's Transport – In response to the Labour Government's Transport 10 Year Plan the ITC released in 2001 a report on 'Tomorrow's Transport' calling for bolder policy initiatives to tackle potential future problems. The report was widely reviewed, particularly the conclusion that traffic would eventually become increasingly unmanageable in suburban and rural areas, and helped shift policy in the direction of 'liveable streets'.

Road Pricing – The commission published a series of reports on Road Pricing in the mid-2000s (decade) led by Professor Stephen Glaister. The reports were welcomed by the government as evidence that road pricing could pay for new roads. At the same time the ITC noted that the government would have to be clear where the extra money would be spent, and warned that there was a risk of increasing congestion on rural roads.

Long Distance Travel – In 2010 the ITC published the results of a three-year project developing a model to forecast long-distance travel demand in Britain. The study indicated that economic growth remained the single biggest factor affecting long-distance travel demand in Britain, and noted that in the absence of major policy measures the demand for air travel would accelerate. The findings have recently been seized by the opposition to High Speed 2 to show that passenger growth arising from High Speed Rail could be limited.

Suburbs – The commission asked Professor Marcial Echenique of the University of Cambridge to report on the future of British Suburbs and Exurbs. Echenique's report warned that current policies would encourage suburban expansion, increasing both commuting times and carbon emissions, forcing a rethink of government policy.

Land Use Effects of the 10 Year Plan – Fearing that transport and land use policy had become increasingly disconnected, in 2002 the ITC commissioned Sir Peter Hall to investigate the land use effects of the Government's 10 Year Plan. Hall's conclusions that the Plan would encourage urban sprawl and threaten regeneration was credited with encouraging a re-orientation of policy towards more brownfield development.

== See also ==
- List of UK think tanks
