= Saunt =

Saunt may refer to:

People

- Claudio Saunt (born 1967), American professor, author, and historian
- Deborah Saunt (born 1965), Australian-born English architect, urban designer, and academic

Other meanings

- Saunt (card game), an early name for the card game of Piquet

== See also ==
- Anathem
