= Lisa-Jayne Lewis =

British broadcaster and commentator (born 1977)

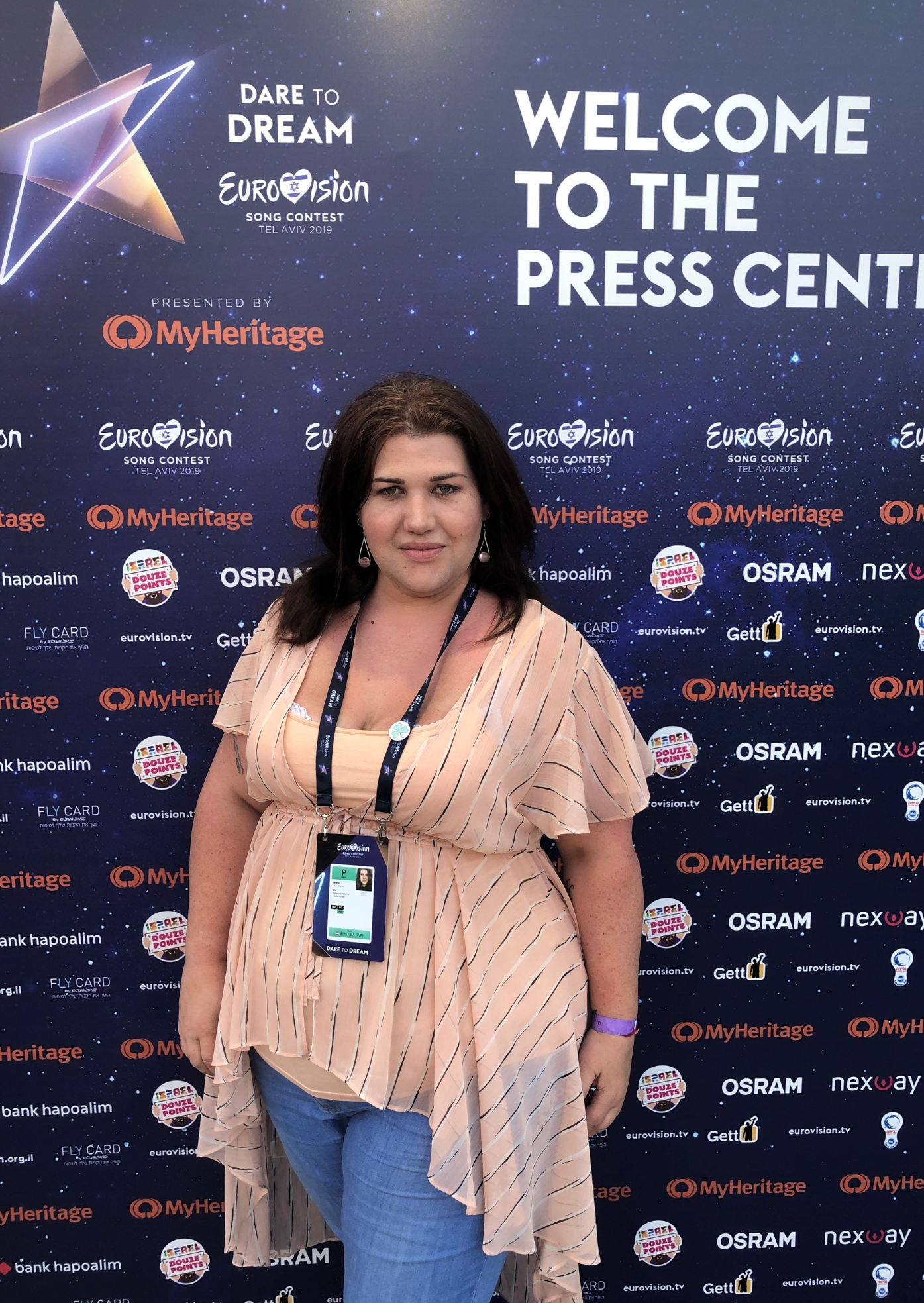
- Lewis at the Eurovision Song Contest 2019 in Tel Aviv, Israel
- Born: 4 October 1977 (age 48); Aldershot, Hampshire, England
- Years active: 2016–present

Lisa-Jayne Lewis (born 4 October 1977) is a British broadcaster and commentator specialising in the Eurovision Song Contest and Junior Eurovision Song Contest. She has provided relief support for multiple disasters and manages artists.

== Early life ==
Lisa-Jayne Lewis was born in Aldershot, Hampshire. She moved as a child to Guildford, Surrey and was educated at Bishop Reindorp School (now Christ's College, Guildford) .

== Eurovision Song Contest and Junior Eurovision Song Contest ==
Along with Ewan Spence and Ana Filipa Rosa, Lewis was a commentator for the first USA Radio broadcast of 2018 Eurovision Song Contest from Lisbon, Portugal.

Lewis provided English language international commentary at the Junior Eurovision Song Contest 2016 from Valletta, Malta and the Junior Eurovision Song Contest 2017 from Tbilisi, Georgia.

Since 2016, and following the departure of Luke Fisher in 2015, Lewis has been co-commentator with Ewan Spence on the Unofficial Alternative Online Commentary of the semi-finals (2016, 2017, 2018) and the grand final (2016, 2017). Neither Spence nor Lewis covered the grand final in 2018 as they were commentating for USA Radio. For a number of years, Lewis also presented Eurovision content on Radio 6 International, bringing daily news and reporting from backstage at the contest.

From 2019 Lewis has covered both Eurovision and Junior Eurovision as part of Switch Radio UK's 'All Out Eurovision' team, producing & hosting radio programming that is syndicated to a number of radio stations in the Switch Radio & Gateway Media networks, broadcasting in the UK and Gibraltar.

For many years, Lewis has contributed to Eurovision content on local and national radio and TV programming including reporting for The Victoria Derbyshire Show on BBC2, BBC News 24 and, from the 2024 Contest, for Newsnight on BBC2.

== Personal life ==
Lewis moved to Boston, Massachusetts in 2000 and spent six years living in the USA during which time she was a soldier and officer (ordained minister) of The Salvation Army. She provided disaster relief support following the 9/11 attacks on the World Trade Center where she worked as an on-site night chaplain. In 2005, she worked as part of the Gulf Coast Logistics Management team in the aftermath of Hurricane Katrina. Subsequent to her work at Ground Zero, she suffers with PTSD as well as breathing problems as a result of asbestos inhalation. During her time with The Salvation Army, she lived in the Jubilee House in Dorchester, the former home of Jordan and Jonathan Knight from New Kids on the Block.

Lewis now lives in Herefordshire. She is named on the Lesbian and Gay Christian Movement 'Rainbow List', a list of influential LGBT Christians in the UK. In 2019, Lewis became a trustee of the charity OneBodyOneFaith (formerly the Lesbian and Gay Christian Movement) she openly identifies as bisexual/pansexual. She also works as an educator in death, dying and end-of-life care, having created and now runs a small community organisation, she was a guest speaker at Greenbelt Festival 2023 speaking about death and dying.

During the 2017 Eurovision season, she became close friends with Montenegrin representative Slavko Kalezić, who she now manages. She accompanied Slavko all through his time on The X Factor UK and can be seen in a number of clips alongside him.

As a singer and songwriter, Lewis has small artist project and releases music under the artist name Ladybird. She released a debut EP in August 2024 and in November 2024 was confirmed as an competing artist in the 4th edition of Una Voce per San Marino.

In 2025, she formalised and officially launched Britalia Music to capture the management and artist support work she had been doing with a number of artists alongside Slavko, these include Piqued Jacks, Dramalove, TAOMA and The Roop.
