= Tickle Cock Bridge =

Pedestrian underpass in Castleford, West Yorkshire, England

Coordinates: 53.725118°N 1.351402°W

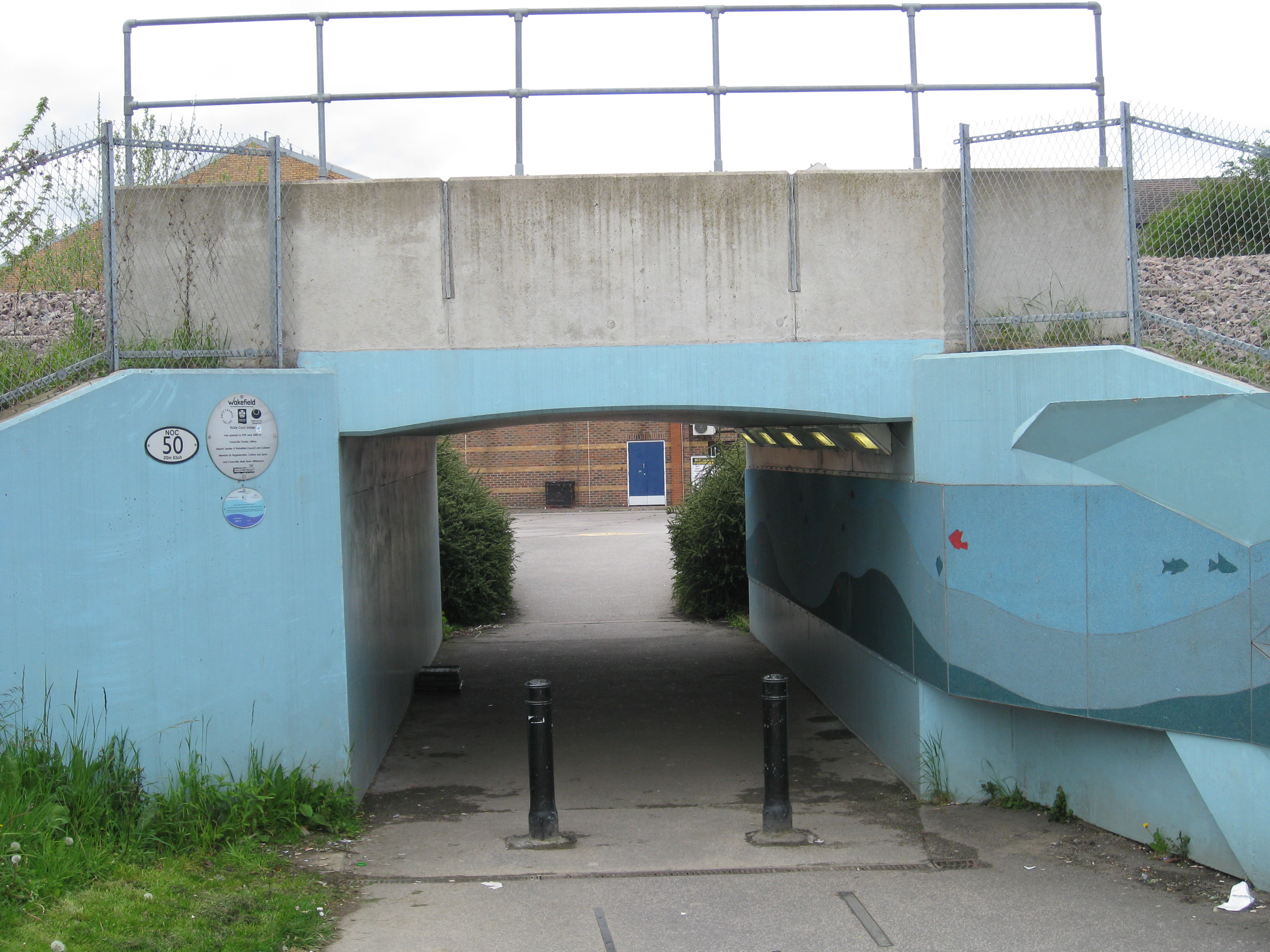
View from the south side

Tickle Cock Bridge is a pedestrian underpass in Castleford, England, under a railway line originally built by the York and North Midland Railway between York and Normanton. Built in 1890, the thoroughfare now connects the town's main residential area with the Carlton Lanes Shopping Centre, and is used by 50,000 pedestrians each week. The original Victorian structure, described by the shopping centre's manager as "small, narrow, very low and gloomy" and "frightening to walk through", was replaced in 2008 as part of an urban regeneration scheme.

The replacement bridge was initially renamed Tittle Cott. After a protest organised by a local over-50s group, Wakefield Council reversed its decision and a plaque bearing the original name, Tickle Cock, was installed.

== History and etymology ==
The word "cock" was first recorded in use as a vulgar term for the penis in the 16th century. Since roosters have also been dubbed "cocks", the term derives from the "tap-like shape" of a rooster's head and in "its function in 'pouring' semen", according to Cassell's Dictionary of Slang. It was once common in England for areas to be given names that reflected their function or the activity taking place within them. Local historian Brian Lewis believes that may be the explanation for the name that locals gave to the bridge during the late 19th or early 20th century: "[the underpass] would function in the same way as any 'monkey run', where you paraded up and down to find a boyfriend or girlfriend". (Note: "Monkey run" was a British slang term for streets "where groups of young people paraded up and down, usually at weekends, in the hope of 'clicking' with somebody".)

== Replacement ==
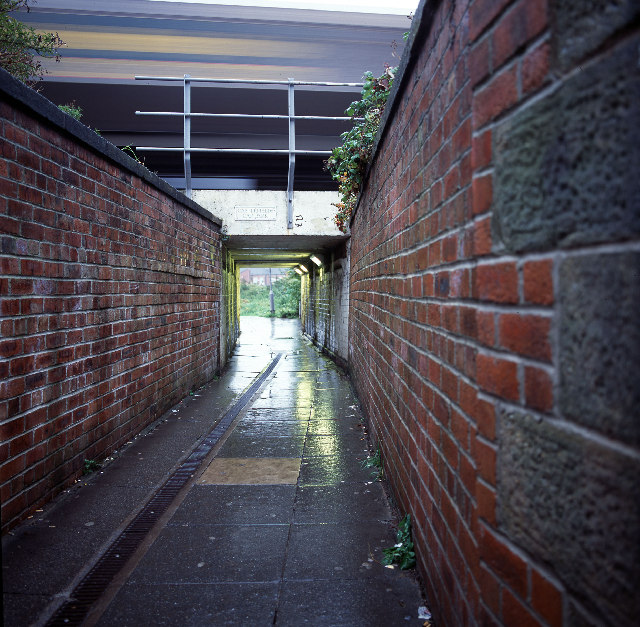
Original 1890 structure

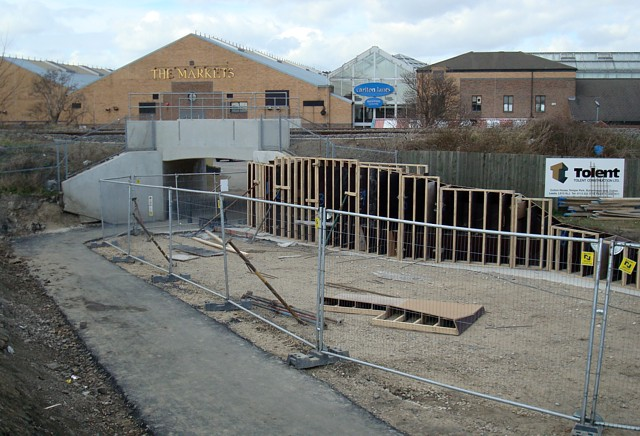
Prefabricated tunnel installed and waiting to be landscaped, 2005

The new underpass was designed by architects Deborah Saunt and Sam Potter of DSDHA (Deborah Saunt David Hills Architects) in collaboration with Brian Lewis and artist Martin Richman. Funding for the project was provided jointly by Wakefield Council, the Neighbourhood Renewal Fund, Network Rail, and the Arts Council England, Yorkshire.

After a competition in 2003, design and planning work continued until 2007. The Victorian underpass was replaced by a prefabricated concrete tunnel, twice the width and 2 feet (0.61 m) taller than the original, by construction engineers Jane Wernick Associates in December 2005. As the installation took place under a live railway that was supported by the underpass, work was planned to cause the minimum disruption to train services; the line had to be closed for only two days around Christmas 2005. The bridge's surroundings were improved in 2008, with better lighting, a new green space, and an angular seating shelter facing south-west to catch the sun in the evening. Richman worked on the lighting scheme, and the designers decided to line the walls of the underpass with a "tactile red flock" material, as an allusion to its "colourful history".

The new bridge was opened on 27 June 2008 by Councillor Denise Jefferey. The Times described the £200,000 structure as a "piece of sophisticated concrete geometry". Saunt commented that it "is about cheering up those spots planning usually forgets about". The replacement of the underpass was one of twelve elements in the Castleford Regeneration Project, originally proposed in 2001. It was featured in a four-part television series, Kevin McCloud and the Big Town Plan, broadcast by Channel 4 in August–September 2008.

== Naming controversy ==
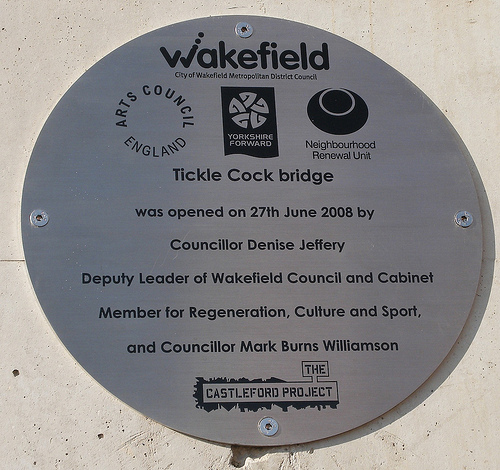
Plaque commemorating the opening of the new bridge

The council decided to name the new underpass Tittle Cott, a move that was met with dismay by local residents. The Castleford Area Voice for the Elderly, an over-50s group, organised a campaign to have the name Tickle Cock restored. The group's chairman, Margaret Shillito, was quoted in The Telegraph as saying, "The old plaque was wrong, it had the wrong name on and we were offended by it". Brian Lewis was quoted as saying "I feel we should never alter names and Tickle Cock has a very clear message behind it". A public meeting was held at which a "large majority" voted in favour of reverting to the original name, a decision that persuaded the council to replace the bridge's plaque with one bearing the legend Tickle Cock.

== See also ==
- Gropecunt Lane
