= Cock Bridge =

Cock Bridge can refer to:

- Cock Bridge (Aberdeenshire)
- Cock Bridge (Ljubljana)

== See also ==
- Tickle Cock Bridge
