= Kim Jones (designer) =

English fashion designer (born 1973)

Kim Jones OBE
- Born: 11 September 1973 (age 53); London, England
- Education: Central Saint Martins; University of the Arts London
- Occupations: Creative Director, Fashion designer
- Years active: 2003 – present
- Labels: Kim Jones (2003–2008); Louis Vuitton (2011–2018); Dior (2018–2025); Fendi (2020–2024); Kim Jones Studio (2019–present); Bosideng (2025–present)

Kim Niklas Jones OBE (born 11 September 1973) is an English fashion designer.

A graduate of Central St Martins College of Art and Design, he had served as the Artistic Director of menswear for Louis Vuitton, Womenswear for Fendi, and Dior Homme.

He is currently the Creative Director for Bosideng new premium urban line Areal, and also running his own project Kim Jones Studio.

== Early life and education ==
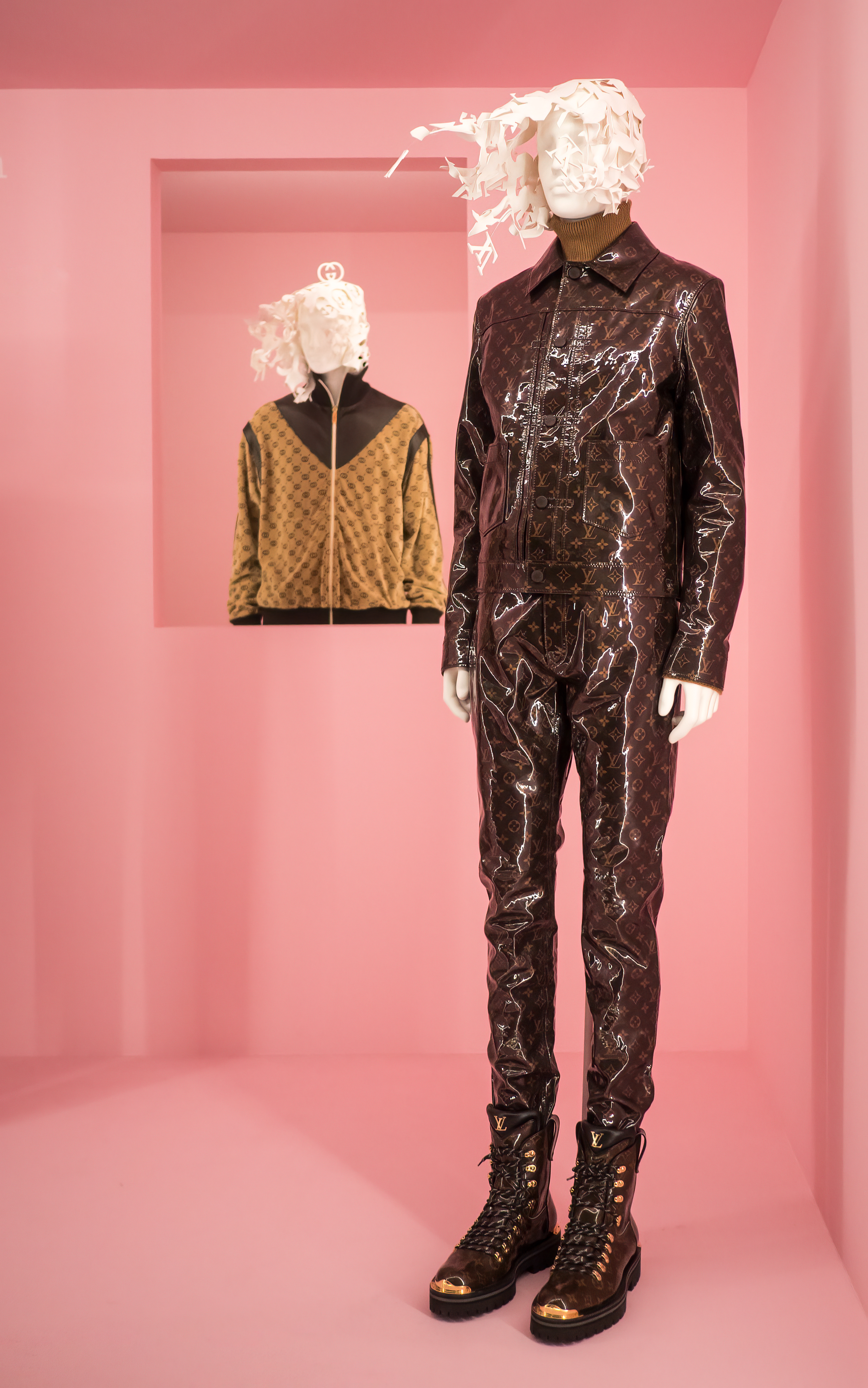
An ensemble by Jones for Louis Vuitton [right] on display at The Met's exhibit Camp: Notes on Fashion

Born in London, Jones spent his childhood in Ecuador, the Caribbean, and Africa, following his father's job as a hydrologist.

Jones studied graphics and photography at Camberwell School of Art before enrolling in the MA Fashion course at Central Saint Martins, studying menswear. He graduated in 2002.

== Career ==
=== Kim Jones, 2003–2008 ===
Jones launched his eponymous brand in 2003, and in 2005 showed as part of the first season of MAN in conjunction with Fashion East, showcasing a short fashion film. Other presentations have varied from films with Alasdair McLellen and Toyin, to a book with American art photographer Luke Smalley.

Alongside his own brand, he collaborated or worked with a wide range of other brands during this period, including Hugo Boss, Topman, Umbro, Mulberry, Iceberg, and Kanye West's Pastelle, before being appointed as Creative Director for British men's luxury-goods brand Alfred Dunhill in 2008. After joining Dunhill, he closed his own brand.

=== Louis Vuitton, 2011–2018 ===
In 2011, Jones was named the new style director of the men's ready-to-wear division at Louis Vuitton, replacing Paul Helbers, who had held the position for five years. During his time at the label, he helped develop a hit collaboration in 2017 with skatewear brand Supreme on a collection of branded hoodies, bags and other goods.

On 17 January 2018, it was announced that Jones would be leaving Vuitton as men's artistic director, after showing his final collection, A/W18, the following day.

=== Dior, 2018–2025 ===
On 19 March 2018, Jones was announced as artistic director of Dior Homme, replacing Kris Van Assche. Prior to his first Dior Homme show, it was confirmed that he had designed the morning suit worn by David Beckham at the wedding of Prince Harry and Meghan Markle on 19 May 2018. Jones debuted his first collection for Dior Homme in June 2018 at Men's Fashion Week in Paris.

In May 2019, Jones revealed concept sketches for South Korean artists, BTS, announcing that Dior would be in charge of designing custom-made tour outfits, ahead of the band's Love Yourself World Tour. With the help of other creative directors such as Matthew Williams and Yoon Ahn (Dior's jewellery director) they incorporated Dior's iconic feminine, floral designs with industrial-like harnesses and chains.

Jones has been assisted for some 15 years by fellow Brit designer Lucy Beeden, who is currently Dior Men's Design Director.

In 2024 Jones launched first ever Dior Men's couture collection inspired by photographs of Rudolf Nureyev by his uncle Colin Jones.

As of January 2025, Dior announced that Kim Jones was stepping down as artistic director of Dior Homme as he resigned with his assistant Lucy.

=== Fendi, 2020–2024 ===
In September 2020, Jones was announced as also taking the role of Artistic Director of Fendi's women's collection, formerly occupied by Karl Lagerfeld.

In October 2024, it was announced that Kim Jones would be stepping down from his role as Artistic Director of Fendi's haute couture, ready-to-wear, and fur collections for women.

=== Bosideng, 2025– ===
In 2025, Leading Chinese down jacket brand, Bosideng, has appointed none other than Kim Jones as the creative director for its new premium urban line, Areal. The former artistic director of menswear at Dior and womenswear at Fendi has unveiled his first collection for Areal, showcasing a unique blend of luxury, street style, and innovative outerwear technology. As seen on models Yu Shuxin and Ju Xiaowen, the collection presents a reinvention of the modern business wardrobe. Since 2012, Bosideng has focused its efforts on expanding internationally through the reopening of its London flagship and launching over 350 stores in Italy. A collaboration with Jean Paul Gaultier and endorsements by celebrities like Nicole Kidman and Kendall Jenner have also fuelled the brand’s visibility in the West. With Kim Jones at the helm of Areal, Bosideng is looking to elevate the brand onto the global luxury stage.

=== Other projects ===
Jones has contributed both as stylist and art director for magazines including Dazed & Confused, Arena Homme +, Another Magazine, the New York Times T Style magazine, 10 Men, V Man, i-D magazine, Harper's Bazaar, Numero Homme, and Fantastic Man. He has also contributed womenswear styling for V and POP magazines.

- 'Umbro by Kim Jones', photographed by Alasdair McLellan, self-published, 2006
- Short film ‘Everywhere’ with Alasdair McLellan, for London Fashion Week February 2006
- Short film ‘Poplife’ with Will Davidson, for showstudio.com Spring/Summer 2006
- A womenswear collection for Isetan Tokyo 120th anniversary alongside Visionaire and Comme des Garçons
- Exhibition at the Museum of London, "The London Look – fashion from the street to catwalk," October
- ‘Kim Jones’ by Luke Smalley, published by Twin Palms, 2004
- Short film with Toyin for the launch of the Autumn/Winter 2003 collection edited by Andrew Daffy
- Short film, "Raphi" with Toyin, for showstudio.com

== Awards and honours ==
- 2021 British Fashion Awards - FOR DIOR MEN AND FENDI
- 2009 British Fashion Awards - Menswear Designer Of The Year, Kim Jones for Dunhill.
- 2006 British Fashion Awards - Menswear Designer Of The Year
- Topshop New Generation Award, twice winner
- Dazed and Confused/Egg Bursary
- GQ Magazine – 3 nominations for "Man Of The Year" Awards two years running
- Elle Style Awards – 3 nominations
- Arena magazine- menswear design award nominee
- 2019 British Fashion Awards - Menswear Designer Of The Year

Jones was appointed Officer of the Order of the British Empire (OBE) in the 2020 Birthday Honours for services to fashion.

In Paris in January 2025, Jones was appointed Knight (Chevalier) of the Legion of Honour and was thus referred to - albeit tongue-in-cheek - as "Sir Kim" by the media including Vogue.

== Personal life ==
Jones is a nephew of photographer Colin Jones (1936-2021). He lives in London, in a house designed by the Italian architect Gianni Botsford.
