= Architecture Foundation =

British architecture organisation

The Architecture Foundation
- The Architecture Foundation logo
- Established: 1991
- Legal status: Charity
- Key people: Ellis Woodman
- Website: architecturefoundation.org.uk

Founded in 1991, the Architecture Foundation is Britain's oldest independent architecture centre. It examines contemporary issues in architectural theory and practice, through a public programme that has involved exhibitions, competitions, publications, lectures, films and debates.

== History ==
The organisation was established in 1991 under the direction of Ricky Burdett and initially operated from a gallery in Alison and Peter Smithson's buildings for the Economist magazine.

Under Rowan Moore's subsequent tenure as director, the organisation ran the Yard Gallery in Clerkenwell as a temporary space experimenting in different ways of exhibiting and communicating architecture before moving to Carmody Groarke-designed headquarters in Southwark. Under the direction of Sarah Ichioka it gave itself a greater international remit, manifesting itself in 2009 through a series of exchange programmes. The Southwark headquarters also operated a project space, again hosting a variety of exhibitions, installations and talks.

The Architecture Foundation left the Southwark space in 2014 due to financial problems following the withdrawal of Arts Council funding to all architecture programmes throughout England and Wales. In 2015 it co-located with the Sir John Cass Faculty of Art, Architecture and Design at London Metropolitan University's Central House in Aldwych. In 2015, it appointed director Ellis Woodman to restructure the organisation on the basis of a private funding model. The following year saw the launch of Architecture on Stage, an ongoing series of talks and debates curated by the Architecture Foundation in partnership with the Barbican Centre, which has included lectures by prominent architects.

Following London Metropolitan University's sale of Central House in 2016, the Architecture Foundation relocated to The Royal College of Art in Kensington. Since 2020, the charity has operated from the offices of Allford Hall Monaghan Morris.

At the start of the 2020 COVID-19 pandemic, the Architecture Foundation established an online series called the 100 Day Studio, which delivered up to three free daily lectures over the course of 100 days. The series was recognised by The Guardian as one of the cultural highlights of the year.

== New Architecture Writers ==
In 2017 critic Phineas Harper and historian Tom Wilkinson founded New Architecture Writers as part of The Architecture Foundation.

== People ==
=== Directors ===
- Ricky Burdett (1991-1997)
- Jeremy Melvin (1997)
- Lucy Musgrave (1997-2002)
- Rowan Moore(2002-2008)
- Sarah Ichioka (2008-2014)
- Ellis Woodman (2015-present)

=== Chair of board of trustees ===
- Richard Rogers
- Will Alsop
- Brian Clarke
- Simon Allford
- Cindy Walters
- Jamie Fobert (December 2023 - present)
