= 192 Shoreham Street =

Building in Sheffield, England

Coordinates: 53.3742°N 1.4678°W

192 Shoreham Street in Sheffield, England, is a building with striking architectural design. It has been identified by The Atlantic as one of 2012's most interesting buildings and received an RIBA award in 2013. The £1 million renovation designed by Project Orange features an angular postmodern addition on top of a brick warehouse on the lower floor. The original part of the building was converted to be used as a bar/restaurant and had a steel structure added to support the weight of the rooftop offices.
