= Deborah Saunt David Hills Architects =

British architecture practice

DSDHA

Practice information
- Key architects: Deborah Saunt, David Hills
- Location: London

DSDHA is a London-based architecture, urban design and spatial research studio.

== Practice ==
DSDHA (Deborah Saunt David Hills Architects) was established by Deborah Saunt and David Hills. Tom Greenall and Martin Pearson were made directors in 2021. The practice has a variety of projects including arts and culture, education, housing, urban and landscape, and workplaces. The studio had received 20 RIBA Awards, been shortlisted for the 2010 RIBA Stirling Prize, and twice been nominated for the European Union Prize for Contemporary Architecture – Mies van der Rohe Award.

== Selected projects ==
Education

- Christ's College, Guildford - shortlisted for the Stirling Prize in 2010 and nominated for the Mies Van der Rohe Award
- St Anne's SureStart Centre in Colchester - nominated for the EU Mies Van der Rohe Award in 2009

Arts and culture

- Refurbishment of the Islington home of the National Youth Theatre

Workplaces

- Studio-gallery for artist Edmund de Waal in West Norwood
- Studio and workshop for British jewellery designer Alex Monroe in Bermondsey
- Flat-iron building for Bosideng on South Molton Street

Residential

- A residential block for the Riverside development on the Greenwich Peninsula
- The residential building Vesta House for the Olympic Village, designed for athletes and then converted to affordable housing
- Abell & Cleland in Westminster, which won the Best New Place to Live at the London Planning Awards and the London Evening Standard New Homes Award
- Corner House in Fitzrovia for Derwent London, which won a New London Architecture Award
- Suffolk House for Derwent London, which won the National Housing Award for best small development and a Housing Innovation Award

Urban design and landscape

- Framework for Camden's West End Project to revitalise Tottenham Court Road
- Redesign of the public realm around the Royal Albert Hall
- A new park for the City of London above Liverpool Street Station
- Strategy for the British Library's public realm
- The creation of the Cundy Street Quarter, a new 2.4-acre mixed-tenure neighbourhood between Pimlico, Chelsea and Victoria in Westminster
- Urban scale work includes the regeneration of a 600-home estate for the London Borough of Southwark
- Landscape-led masterplan of Central Somers Town for Camden
- Refurbishment of the Economist Plaza in London, designed by Alison and Peter Smithson

== Research and teaching ==
DSDHA carries out funded research into critical urban issues, such as cultural infrastructure and the future of London's urban mobility, as well as embedding a strong element of research into all its projects.

The studio has twice been awarded the Royal Commission for the Exhibition of 1851’s Research Fellowship in the Building Environment, to research the public realm of Albertopolis and active travel in London.

Members of the practice are or have been teaching at the London School of Architecture, the Royal College of Art, the University of Navarra, and Yale School of Architecture.
