= St Paul's bus station =

Coordinates: 52.5856°N 1.9825°W

St Paul's Bus Station
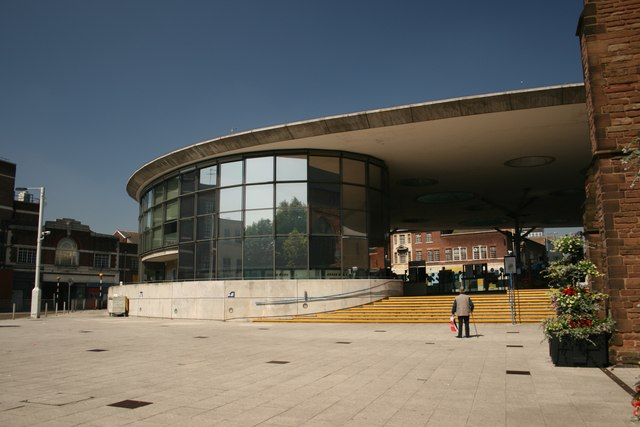
- Outside Walsall bus station in 2008
- Interactive map of the St Paul's Bus Station area

General information
- Type: Transport
- Location: Walsall, West Midlands, England
- Completed: September 2000

Technical details
- Floor count: 2

Design and construction
- Architect: Allford Hall Monaghan Morris
- Structural engineer: Atelier One
- Services engineer: Atelier Ten
- Civil engineer: Clark Smith Partnership
- Other designers: Watkins Dally
- Quantity surveyor: Appleyard & Trew
- Main contractor: Shepherd Building Group

St Paul's Bus Station is one of two bus stations located in the town of Walsall in the West Midlands, England. The station is managed by Transport for West Midlands, and is the terminus for a large number of bus routes operated by National Express West Midlands, Diamond Bus, Walsall Community Transport and D&G Bus.

== Architecture ==
The concrete, elliptical roof of St Paul's Bus Station stands on twelve steel columns. The roof covers an area of 3,171 m^{2} (34,132 sq ft), beneath which are three bus islands, consisting of a total of eleven bus stands. A smaller aerofoil covers a further three stands. 2.4 metres (8 ft) tall glass screens shelter pedestrians from bus fumes and provide information on bus routes. At each of the bus stands is hardwood bench set within a low concrete wall. The benches were designed to be vandal-proof. At its longest point, the canopy is 80 metres (262 ft) in length and 45 metres (148 ft) wide at its widest point. The roof is covered in ten circular holes with hoods to deflect the wind. There are seventeen similar rooflights in the canopy. The concourse area is two storeys tall and consists of large concrete walls, supporting the columns for the canopy roof. The bus station covers a total area of 9,470 m^{2} (101,934 sq ft).

Allford Hall Monaghan Morris designed the building for Centro. The structural engineers were Atelier One, Shepherd Construction Ltd were the contractors, Watkins Dally were the landscape architects and Clark Smith Partnership were the civil engineers. The project cost £6.5 million.

== History ==
A small satellite section was added to the bus station in 2001.

Despite the extensive profile, there have been calls for it to be demolished. Most notably, Walsall South MP Bruce George said that Centro should consider replacing the bus station due to the complexity of the layout. Bus drivers have complained that there were too many bends and that it quickly became overcrowded, which may have contributed to two incidents at the bus station, in one of which a local woman died.

In December 2008, the West Midlands Passenger Transport Executive decided to merge Stands K & L in the main bus station. This resulted in an extra stand being added to the row housing the Travel & Tourist Information Shop, with one being removed in the middle row. No stand alterations were caused by this stand, as no extra stands were created, just rearranged. Two years later in December 2010, the station reverted to its old layout.

In July 2011 the nearby Bradford Place station and the toilets in the main station underwent an extensive refurbishment. Both re-opened during early September 2011.

== Incidents/Events ==
On 9 July 2007, a 66-year-old woman from the Bentley area of Walsall died, and several others were injured, when an Arriva Midlands service 360 to Aldridge went the wrong way up the bus stations one way system, crashing into several pedestrians and other vehicles (which should not have been in the bus station area) before finally being stopped by a National Express West Midlands 51 service double decker to Birmingham. The bus was deliberately driven into the Arriva bus by the female driver to stop its progress. The 62-year-old driver, named as John Connolly, from Burntwood, was charged with causing death by dangerous driving. In February 2009, after a trial at Wolverhampton Crown Court, lasting one week, Mr Connolly was cleared of the charge, an outcome that was welcomed by the police.

On 20 February 2008, an Arriva Midlands service crashed into the back of a Thandi Bus on service 346 causing it to shunt forward. This caused two elderly women to be crushed by the bus, one underneath, the other against the glass pane of a shelter. Both were seriously injured. The Arriva driver was arrested on suspicion of dangerous driving and was released on bail. In July 2008 the driver, Peter Love, appeared in court charged with driving without due care and attention, where he was banned from driving for six months. It was also revealed Arriva Midlands had sacked him.

Both incidents caused the bus station to be shut for several hours, which caused travel disruption in the town centre.

A minor incident occurred on 7 June 2010, this time between a National Express West Midlands bus and a Diamond Bus vehicle both on the 301 service to Mossley. Nobody was seriously injured, and no damage was caused to the station, yet the incident once again prompted calls for the station to be demolished or altered, before another serious incident happened.

On 28 February 2011, a suspect package found outside the neighbouring job centre caused the bus station to be evacuated and closed from 1pm through until 7.30pm after the Bomb Disposal Squad had declared the package safe. This caused disruption to the bus station, and the wider town centre.

Exactly one week later on 7 March 2011, a collision occurred on the approach to the station, involving two National Express West Midlands buses and two cars, neither of which should have been in the vicinity. Although officially on the highway and despite there being no injuries, this again prompted calls for better policing of the interchange or a change of layout.

== Bus services ==
Route	Destination	Via	Operator	Notes
6	Sutton Coldfield	Aldridge, Little Aston	National Express West Midlands	
7	Castlefort	Aldridge, Lazy Hill	National Express West Midlands	
8	Lichfield	Rushall, Pelsall, Brownhills, Burntwood	National Express West Midlands	
9	Wolverhampton	Rushall, Pelsall, Bloxwich, Wednesfield	National Express West Midlands	
10	Brownhills West	Rushall, Walsall Wood, Brownhills	National Express West Midlands	
19	Bloxwich	Coal Pool, Blakenall Heath	Carolean	
22	Chuckery (Circular)	The Butts, Paddock	Walsall Community Transport	
29	Bloxwich	Coal Pool, Blakenall Heath	National Express West Midlands	
31 31	Mossley Estate	Leamore, Bloxwich	National Express West Midlands Diamond West Midlands	
32 32	Lower Farm Estate	Leamore, Bloxwich	National Express West Midlands Diamond West Midlands	
36	Alumwell (Circular)	Manor Hospital	National Express West Midlands	
36	Lichfield	Rushall, Aldridge, Shenstone	Chaserider	
36A	Lichfield	Rushall, Aldridge, Muckley Corner	Chaserider	
41	Willenhall	Shortheath, New Invention, Pool Hayes	National Express West Midlands	
51	Birmingham	Great Barr, Perry Barr, Newtown	National Express West Midlands	
69	Wolverhampton	Short Heath, Coppice Farm, New Cross	National Express West Midlands	
70	Bloxwich	Beechdale, Dudley Fields, Bloxwich	National Express West Midlands	
70A	Beechdale (Circular)	Reedswood	National Express West Midlands	
77/77A	Erdington	Streetly, New Oscott, Minworth	National Express West Midlands	
529	Wolverhampton	Bentley, Willenhall	National Express West Midlands	
637	Manor Hospital	Highgate, Bescot, Pleck	Diamond West Midlands	
674	Wednesbury	Gillity Village, Yew Tree, Friar Park	Walsall Community Transport	
936	Birmingham	Barr Beacon, Pheasey, Kingstanding, Perry Barr	National Express West Midlands	
997	Birmingham	Aldridge, Streetly, Old Oscott, Perry Barr	National Express West Midlands	
X51	Birmingham Cannock	Great Barr (Express Service) Bloxwich, Great Wyrley, Hawks Green	National Express West Midlands	
