= Project Orange =

Architecture practice based in London, England

Practice information
- Location: Shoreditch, London

Significant works and honors
- Buildings: 115-117 Whitecross Street, London; Cemetery Road, Sheffield; 192 Shoreham Street, Sheffield

Project Orange is an architectural practice based in Shoreditch London, UK founded by James Soane and Christopher Ash in 1997. Soane and Ash met at Cambridge University where they studied architecture. Soane was previously a Director of Conran Design, is involved in the validation of architecture schools for the RIBA, is Director of Theory at the London School of Architecture and published New home in 2003.

== Awards ==
- 115-117 Whitecross Street, London – redevelopment and expansion of 17th Century property. RIBA London Award, 2010; The Design Awards 2009, Living Space of the Year; British Homes Awards 2009, one-off house of the year.
- Cemetery Road, Sheffield – high-density housing project. Civic Trust Award; RIBA Yorkshire, White Rose Award 2010.
- 192 Shoreham Street, Sheffield – a £3 million part new-build scheme of office units and health club in an existing tram shed. Sheffield Building of the Year 2012; RIBA Yorkshire regional award 2013
