= National Centre for Popular Music =

Sheffield Hallam Student Union
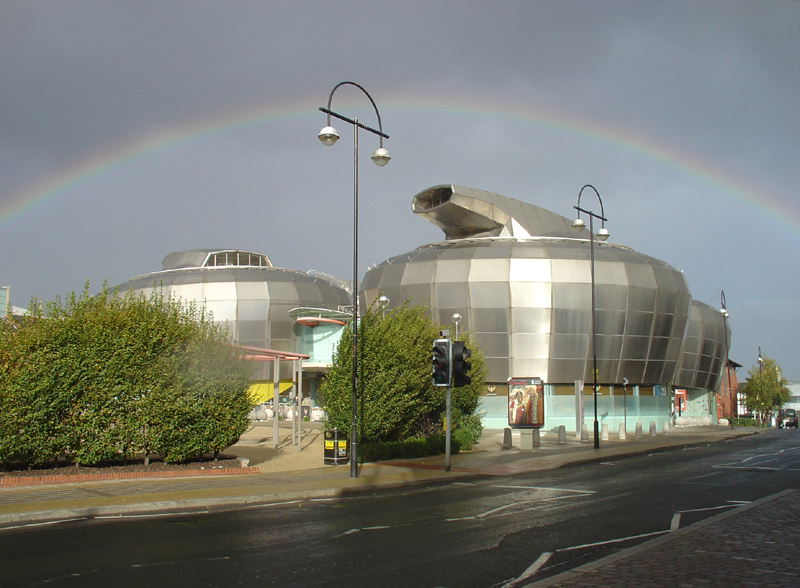
- The National Centre for Popular Music
- Interactive map of the Sheffield Hallam Student Union area
- Former names: National Centre for Popular Music
- Alternative names: The HUBs

General information
- Type: Museum (former), student union
- Architectural style: Avant-garde
- Location: Sheffield, South Yorkshire, Paternoster Row
- Coordinates: 53.3775°N 1.4660°W
- Current tenants: Sheffield Hallam University Students' Union
- Completed: February 1999
- Inaugurated: 1 March 1999
- Cost: £15 million (Lottery funded by £11m)
- Owner: Sheffield Hallam University

Technical details
- Structural system: Stainless steel drums

Design and construction
- Architect: Nigel Coates
- Architecture firm: Branson Coates

Other information
- Public transit: B P Sheffield station

The National Centre for Popular Music was a museum in Sheffield, England, for pop and rock music and contemporary culture generally, a £15 million project largely funded with contributions from the National Lottery, which opened on 1 March 1999, and closed in June 2000. However, the plan for the centre was devised in the mid-1980s and Sheffield City Council were aiming to raise the money for it in April 1993 so the concept long predated the Tony Blair / Cool Britannia era of which it was seen as a notable failure.

== Building ==
The building's design was the subject of a 1996 RIBA architectural design competition. The winning design by Branson Coates (a partnership of Nigel Coates and Doug Branson) consists of four giant stainless steel drums, surrounding an atrium area, the upper floor of which has a glazed roof.

Each of the drums has a rotating turret with a nozzle which is meant to turn with the wind and vent air. On the other side, an opening facing the wind takes inlet air down through wall cavities, being heated or cooled as required. Air is drawn out of the nozzle by buoyancy and wind pressure.

The ground floor contained office space, a shop, a bar, a café and a further exhibition space. Access to this floor was free, with only the top floor forming the museum.

Construction began in 1997 and the building opened in 1999. Although Coates had several commissions in Japan, the National Centre for Popular Music is one of two surviving examples of his work in the UK. Coates's design was inspired by pinball machines and industrial storage tanks. Simon Gedye, chair of the Sheffield Civic Trust, has said the building is "iconic" and "an important building of [Coates's] and for the city."

Additional images
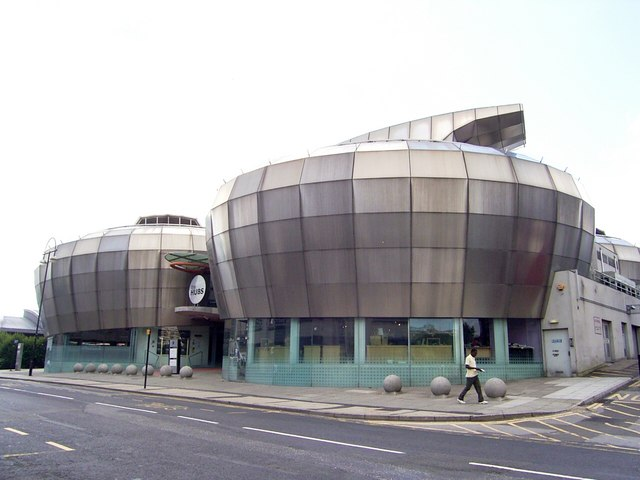
The front of the building from Paternoster Row.

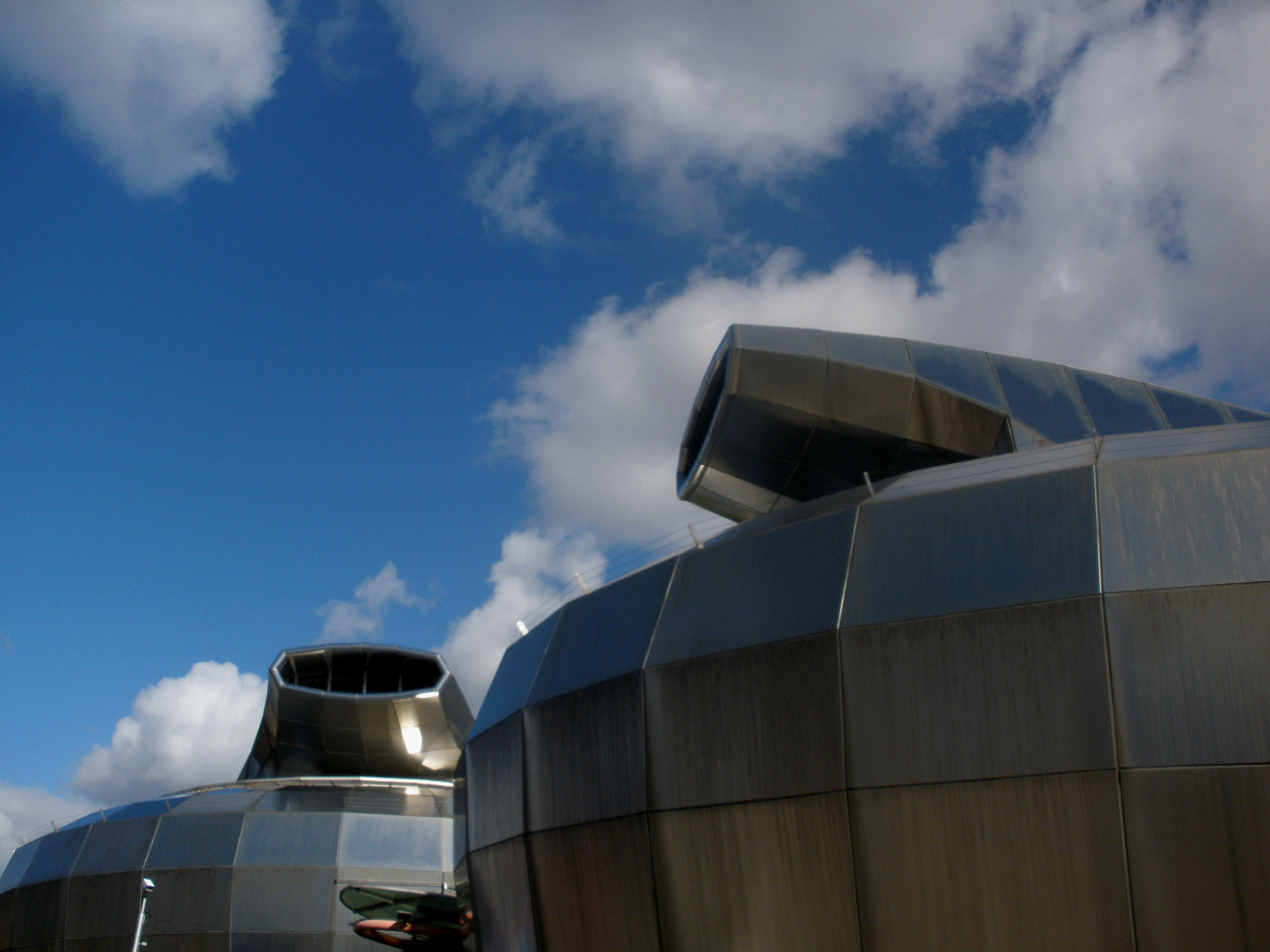
The roof of the HUBS.

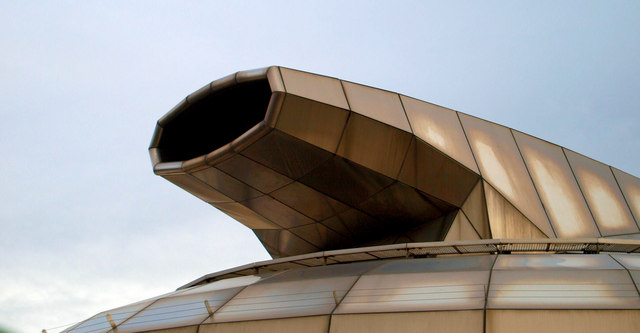
Detail of one of the tops.

== Closure ==
The centre was one of the UK's Millennium Commission projects, developed to celebrate the turn of the millennium. Other Commission funded projects included the Millennium Dome and the London Eye.

However the Centre failed to attract enough visitors and cash flow to ensure its viability for its 79 workers – BBC News described the centre as having been "shunned" by visitors, and, despite a £2 million relaunch, the Centre closed in 2000.

Ticket prices were about £21 for a family of four. It was hoped to attract 400,000 visitors a year. After seven months, there had been 104,000 visitors, and on 18 October 1999 the building's owners, Music Heritage Ltd, called in PricewaterhouseCoopers to administer its day-to-day running. The company was to be liquidated in that November if administration was not successful. It was saved in the interim although £1.1 million was owed to 200 creditors. The estimate of visitors per year was reduced to 150,000. Martin King, the chief executive who took over from Stuart Rogers, resigned in January 2000.

Just prior to closure, BBC Radio 2 held an event hosted by Billy Bragg and attended by around 75 prizewinners, to see Madness perform live with support from Paul Carrack.

== Subsequent use ==
The building became a live music venue for a period from July 2001. In 2003, Sheffield Hallam University bought it from Yorkshire Forward for £1.85 million, using it as the university's students' union and calling it The HUBS. In 2024, the university announced that the students' union would be relocated. The future of the buildings is yet to be confirmed, though demolition has not been ruled out; Historic England refused a pre-emptive listing application by The Twentieth Century Society (C20) without making an assessment of the building; C20 said this left it "extremely vulnerable". In April 2025, the building was placed on C20's Risk List, rated as at risk of demolition. Three months later, the building was added to the South Yorkshire Local Heritage List, the "effective 'waiting room' status for future national listing" according to C20.

== See also ==
- List of music museums
- National Science and Media Museum
- Millennium Dome
- British Music Experience – opened ten years later in March 2009 in London
