= Deborah Saunt =

Australian-English architect

- Born: New South Wales
- Education: Heriot-Watt University/Edinburgh College of Art; University of Cambridge
- Occupation: Architect
- Spouse: David Hills
- Practice: DSDHA

Deborah Saunt is an Australian-born British architect, urban designer and academic. She co-founded the London-based architecture, urban design and spatial research studio DSDHA with David Hills.

== Early life and education ==
Saunt was born in New South Wales, Australia, and grew up in Kenya and England. She attended Heriot-Watt University/Edinburgh College of Art and the University of Cambridge.

Saunt gained her PhD with the RMIT University Practice Research Programme, was awarded a Fellowship in the Built Environment from the Royal Commission for the Exhibition of 1851.

== Career ==
Saunt's first architectural work was with van Heyningen and Haward followed by a role in the early 1990s on the British Library in London under Colin St John Wilson and MJ Long. She later worked for MJ Long's practice, Long and Kentish, before starting to teach in 1997 at the Architectural Association School of Architecture. She has since held teaching appointments at the Royal College of Art, École polytechnique fédérale de Lausanne, the University of Cambridge, and was appointed the Eero Saarinen Visiting Professor of Architectural Design at Yale School of Architecture. She also worked for Tony Fretton.

Saunt established DSDHA with David Hills. With DSDHA, Saunt has designed a flat-iron building for Bosideng on South Molton Street, a residential block for the Riverside development on the Greenwich Peninsula, an Olympic Village block in East Village, a studio-gallery for Edmund de Waal in West Norwood, and a jewellery studio for Alex Monroe in Bermondsey. In 2009, DSDHA’s St Anne’s SureStart Centre in Colchester was nominated for the EU Mies Van der Rohe Award. Saunt and Hills designed a new building for Christ's College in Guildford, for which they were shortlisted for the RIBA Stirling Prize in 2010.

Saunt is a commissioner for the Independent Transport Commission, a member of the Expert Advisory Group for Historic England, a Board Member of the City Property Association, and was a jury panel member for the international competition to re-imagine London's Grosvenor Square. She has lectured at the Royal Academy of Art and regularly broadcasts on architecture and her belief in the broadest participation in city-making.

She has been included in Forbes 500 and in Evening Standard’s Progress 1000 of the most influential people in London.

Saunt "has always looked beyond the confines of the building" in high-profile spatial strategies, urban masterplans and public realm projects. She is active in the democratisation of architecture and the celebrating the role of women in the profession, setting up the Jane Drew Prize in Architecture and is a Founding Director of the London School of Architecture, where she is now a trustee.

== Personal life ==
Saunt is married to her business partner, David Hills. They live in Clapham with their two children.
