= British Music Experience =

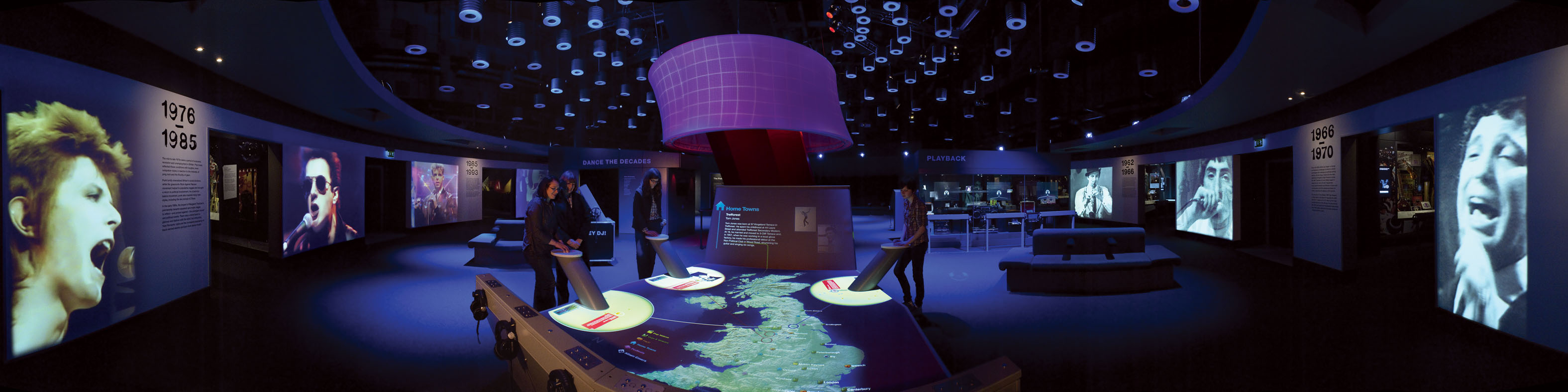
- Established: 2009
- Location: Cunard Building, Water Street/Canada Boulevard, Liverpool, England, United Kingdom
- Coordinates: 53.4041°N 2.9954°W
- Website: Official website

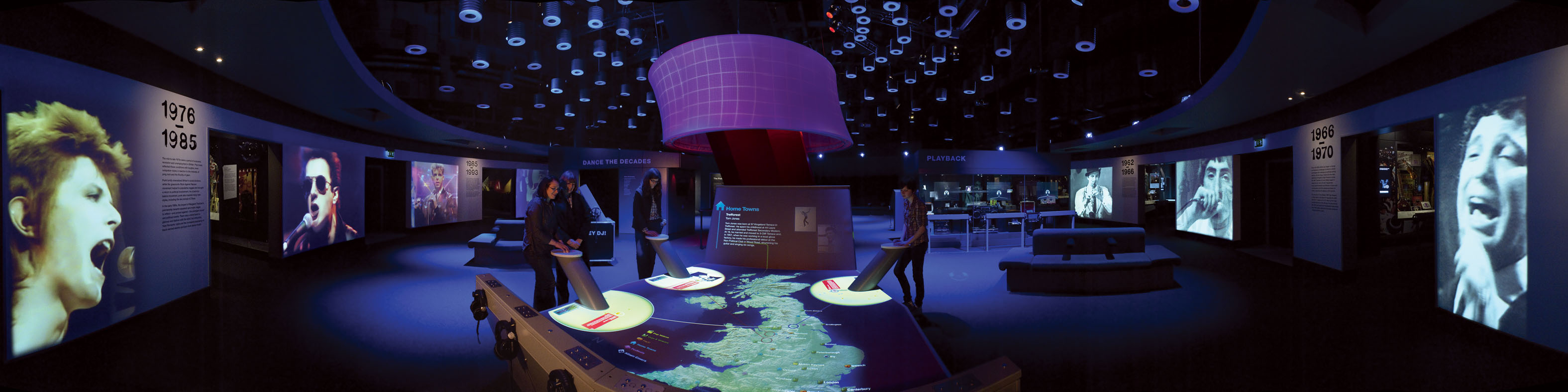
The BME at The O2

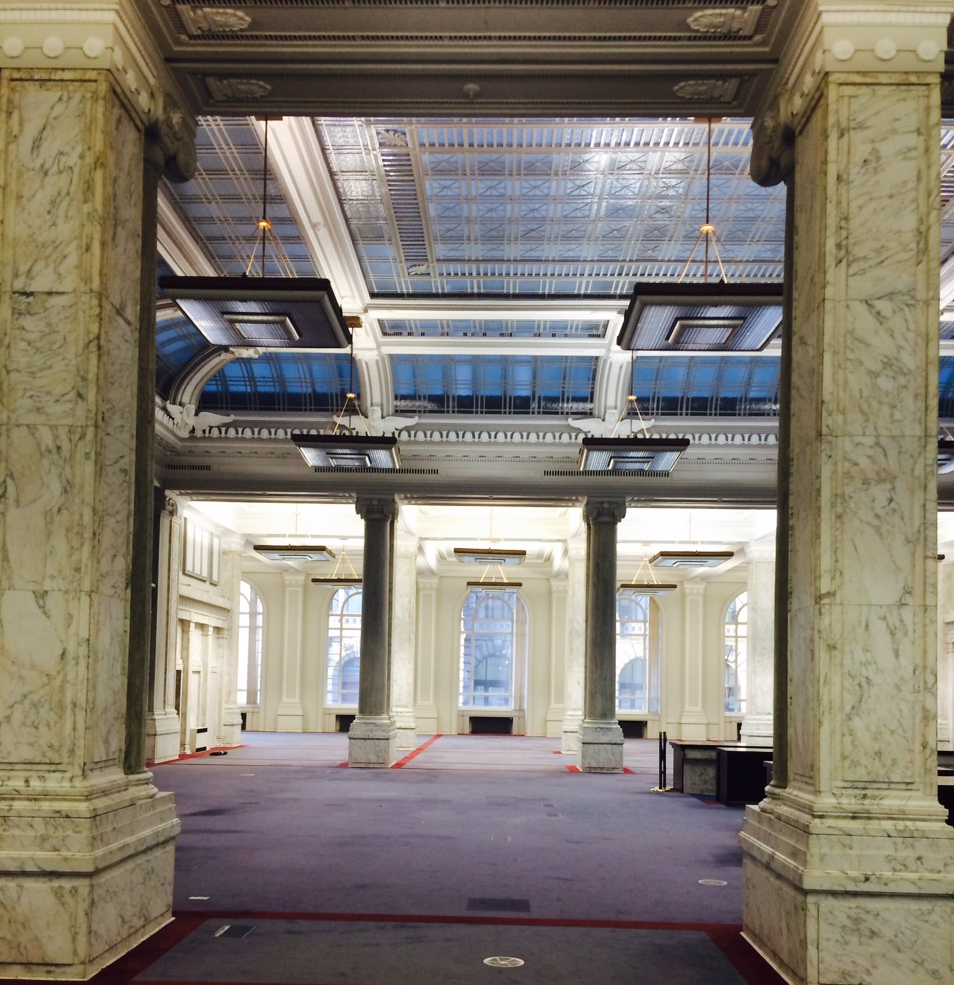
Passenger Baggage Hall, Cunard Building in 2015

The British Music Experience is a permanent exhibition in the Cunard Building on Liverpool's waterfront. It began as an exhibition, taking up more than 20,000 square feet, installed into The O_{2} Bubble, part of The O_{2} in Greenwich, London. Opened with a private concert by The View in March 2009, it featured a retrospective look at the British music industry since 1944. The museum closed on 30 April 2014 and announced it was looking for a new home. On 10 September 2015 it was confirmed that the new home for the British Music Experience would be the Cunard Building on Liverpool's waterfront.

Spearheaded by music mogul Harvey Goldsmith, designed by Land Design Studio and funded by The O_{2} owners AEG, BME was created to fill a gap in the UK Heritage sector for Rock and Pop Music. Previously, the National Centre for Popular Music in Sheffield had attempted to achieve this but failed to attract visitors and was eventually closed.

The British Music Experience has been set up as a charitable trust and has been funded by £9.5m worth of investment from AEG who hoped to recoup their costs within five years. Sponsorship agreements with The Performing Rights Society, Gibson Guitars and Sennheiser amongst others have helped establish the exhibition. In 2010 the UK's fifth biggest food retailer, The Co-operative Group, signed on as the exhibition's main sponsor, pledging to give away 15,000 tickets over the next three years.

== Galleries ==
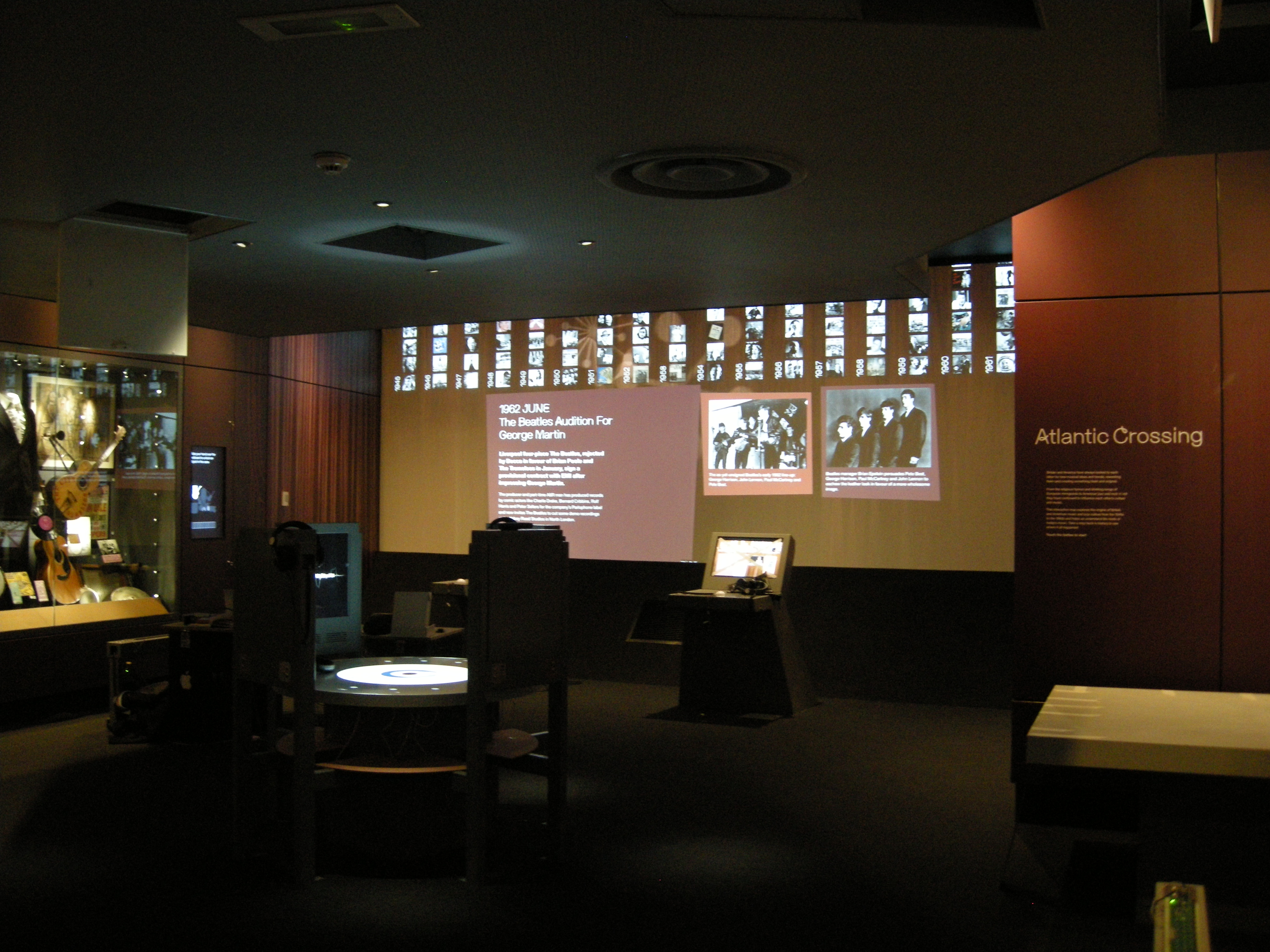
The 1945-62 gallery at the British Music Experience, London.

A narrative with common elements that is divided up into galleries tells the story of popular music in the UK. Together, the zones effectively provide a timeline of the history of British popular music from 1945 to the present. Instead of being divided into convenient decades, they represent the actual moments of change that took place so frequently over the course of our story's 70-year span. In those times of transition, genres change.

There is an interactive timeline in each of the galleries. Each of these has a projected matrix of events with a foreground interface that provides access to in depth digital material. The user is able to scan and select across the whole timeline to select an event which reveals magazine style headlines, images and movies.

Major interactive exhibits which can be found in the museum's galleries include:

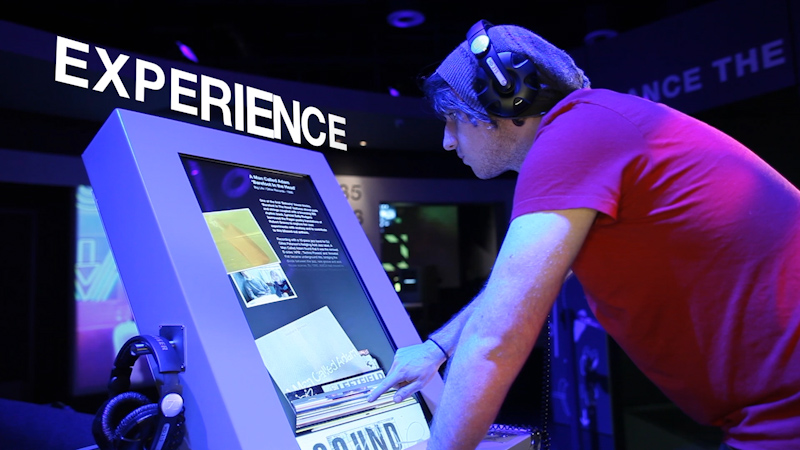
Hey DJ Interactive Exhibit at the BME London

- Showcases and Timelines
- Hey DJ!
- Where It's At
- Anatomy of a Pop Star
- Gibson Interactive Studio
- The Great Divide
- Dance The Decades
- Table Talk
- Atlantic Crossing
- Transmission
- Playback

Many of these interactive exhibits have been developed by specialist software suppliers Clay Interactive Ltd, iso design and Studio Simple with consultation from a curatorial team including Robert Santelli, who worked on other major music exhibits such as The Rock and Roll Hall of Fame in Cleveland, Ohio and The Grammy Museum in Los Angeles. The initial BME curator Paul Lilley, with Sarah Clarke and Laura Bailey, were responsible for the extensive number of artefacts and exhibits on view and the rest of the BME content team was made up of music consultants Rob Dickins, David Roberts and Mark Ellen.

== Artefacts and Memorabilia ==
The BME has an extensive collection of rock and pop artefacts used to curate the rich history of popular British music alongside a social and political backdrop.

- 600+ stage outfits, instruments, hand-written lyrics, and other objects brought to life with interactivity.
- 6000 images & video clips embedded in a digital timeline and archive
- Musical movements mirroring social history, politics, geography and technology in the UK.

The collection is the only comprehensive collection that charts the rise of British Popular Music from its roots in jazz to the present day.

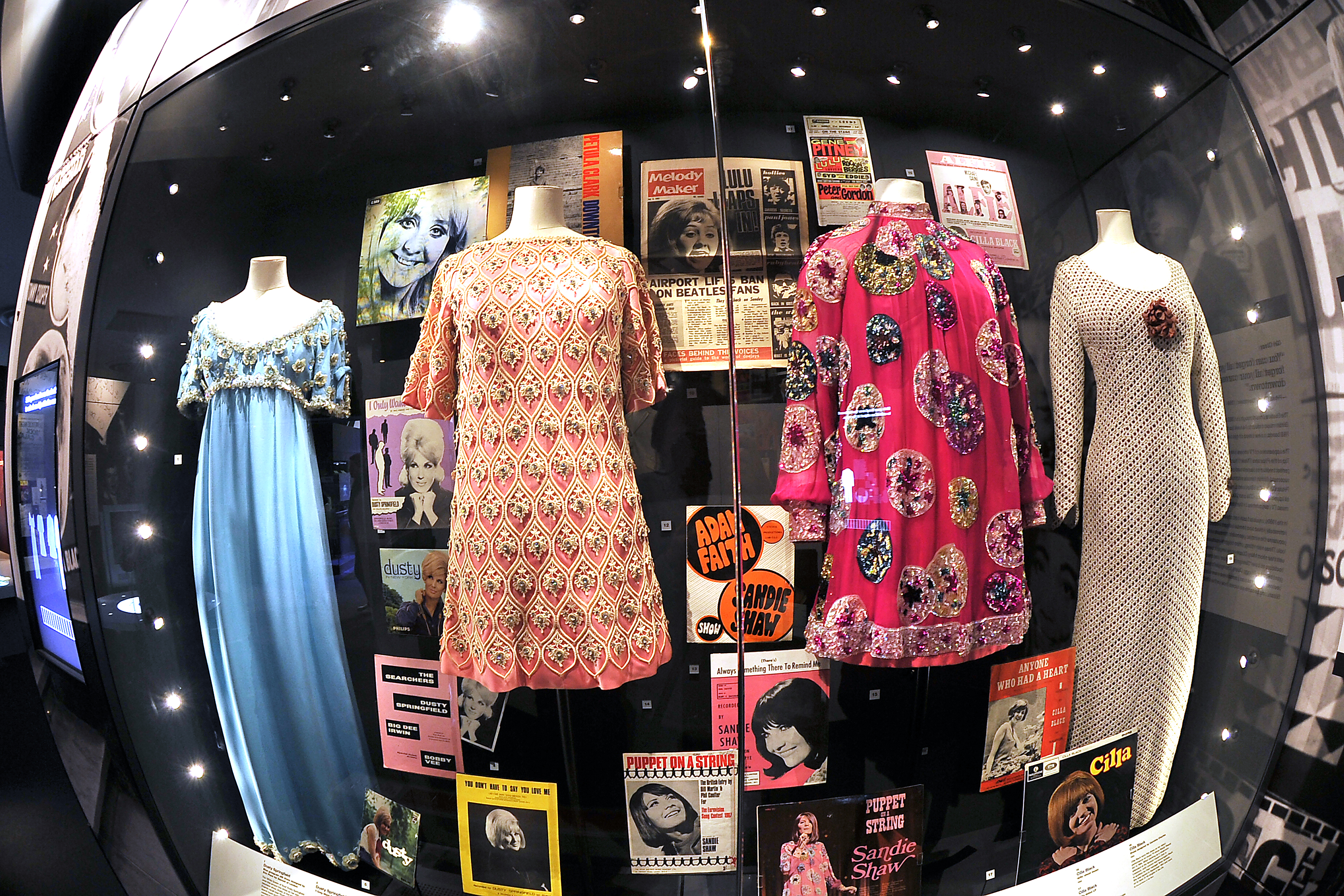
Cilla Black and Dusty Springfield dresses

Highlights of some of the artefacts that can be found at the British Music Experience include:

- Handwritten lyrics from Coldplay
- Some of Elton John's glasses
- Five Spice Girls outfits
- Humphrey Lyttelton's VE-Day trumpet
- David Bowie's Ziggy Stardust costume
- Noel Gallagher's Union Jack guitar
- Iron Maiden's Eddie the Head Icon
- Roger Daltrey's outfit from a gig at Woodstock
- Amy Winehouse's dress from her 'Tears Dry on Their Own' video
- Guitars from Keith Richards, Bill Wyman, Pete Townshend, Brian May, Jamie Cook and Paul Weller

== Learning and public programmes ==
The BME regularly hosts learning and public programmes and temporary exhibitions to delve deeper into a band's artistry or music trends and movements. Past events and exhibitions have included:

- Bon Jovi: Master class/gig
- The Faces: Master class/gig
- Emile Sande: Master class
- Frank Turner: Master class
- Imogen Heap: Master class
- Rudimental: Master class
- Daniel Kramer: Photographs of Bob Dylan
- Rip This Joint: The Rolling Stones 1972. Photographs by Jim Marshall
- Messenger: Bob Marley Exhibition
- Souvenir: 40 Years of OMD
- Rated R: Rihanna Exhibition

BME offers interactive workshops and seminars for schools tied to key stage objectives in the National Curriculum, including subjects such as geography, ICT, citizenship, careers, design and pop culture.

== See also ==
- List of music museums
