= Assembly Bristol =

Office block in Bristol, England

Coordinates: 51°27′12.8″N 02°35′04.1″W

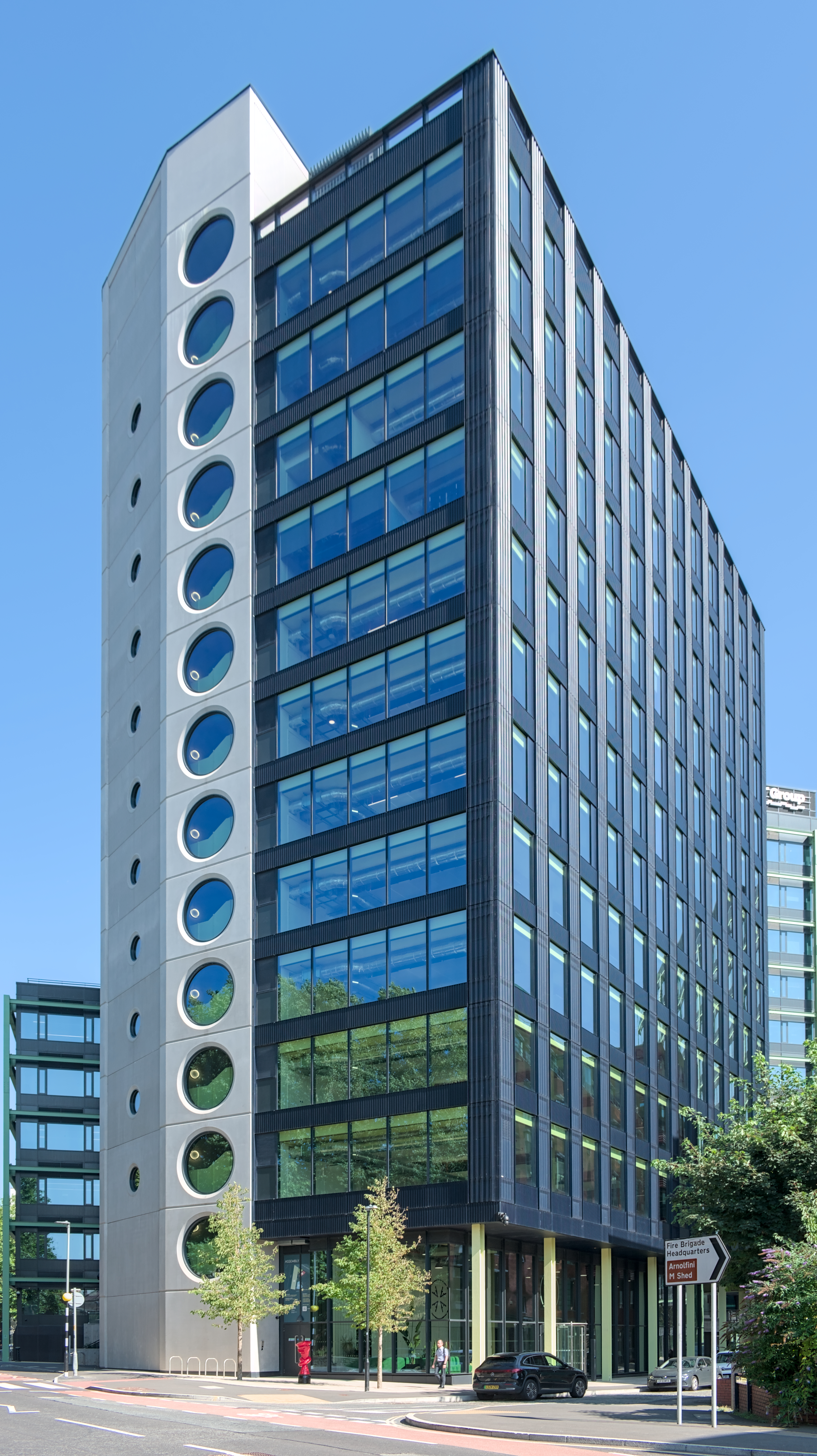

Assembly Bristol is an office block in Bristol, England. It is near the Temple Way dual carriageway and the Floating Harbour.

== History ==
The site was previously occupied by Temple Way House which contained offices for Clerical Medical. It was demolished in 2008. Construction on Assembly Bristol began in early 2019. In October 2019, BT Group signed an agreement to be the sole occupier of the building for a 20-year lease. On 9 November 2020, BT Group announced that it would be moving into the building.

An official opening was held on 23 February 2023.

== Design ==
The main contractor was Galliford Try and the architect was Allford Hall Monaghan Morris. The structural engineer was Arup Group and the steelwork contractor was Severfield. It is 120 metres (390 feet) long and 25 metres (82 feet) wide. It has an exposed green steel frame.
