= John Worthington (architect) =

John Worthington, MBE, an American-qualified architect and specialist in workspace design, has pioneered methods of adapting urban and space planning techniques to meet the needs of emerging knowledge-based economies. From 1992 to 1997, Worthington was director of the Institute of Advanced Architectural Studies and professor of architecture at the University of York.

He has been a visiting professor at the University of Sheffield in Briefing and Building Performance (1997–2008), Chalmers University of Technology, Gothenburg (2000–03) and professorial fellow at the University of Melbourne (2007–10).

Worthington is a commissioner with the Independent Transport Commission and a director of The Academy of Urbanism. He was appointed MBE for his services to transport and urban regeneration in the 2016 New Year Honours List. In 2018 he was made Honorary Fellow of the Royal Institute of the Architects of Ireland.
