= Nigel Coates (architect) =

British architect

Nigel Coates RA
- Born: 1949 (age 76–77); Malvern, Worcestershire, England
- Education: Hanley Castle Grammar School; University of Nottingham (1968–71); Architectural Association (1972–74)
- Occupation: Architect
- Website: nigelcoates.com

Nigel Coates RA (born 1949 in Malvern) is an English architect.

== Early life and education ==
He grew up in the town of Malvern, Worcestershire and was educated at Hanley Castle Grammar School before studying at the University of Nottingham (1968–71) and the Architectural Association (1972–74). In 1985 he formed Branson Coates Architecture with Doug Branson before establishing his own studio of architecture and design in 2006.

== Architectural career ==
Coates' has designed buildings such as the Caffè Bongo (1986), Noah’s Ark (1988), The Wall (1990) and the Art Silo (1992), all in Japan, the Geffrye Museum extension, Oyster House, Powerhouse::uk (all 1998), and the National Centre for Popular Music (now the Sheffield Hallam Hubs music venue) in Sheffield (1999). His work is one of the most well known examples of the NATO (Narrative Architecture Today) movement.

== Exhibitions and interiors ==
His work is held in several museum collections including the Victoria & Albert Museum London, FRAC Orléans, and the Museum for Architectural Drawing Berlin, including drawings of projects such as the House for Derek Jarman and the Tokyo Wall. Coates has designed several shops for fashion designer Katharine Hamnett, the Living Bridges exhibition at the Royal Academy of Arts (1996), the British Pavilion at Expo '98 in Lisbon, the Body Zone at London's Millennium Dome, the Jigsaw flagship store on Knightsbridge, Ecstacity in the British Pavilion at the 2000 Venice Architecture Biennale, Mixtacity (part of the Global Cities exhibition) at Tate Modern in 2007, his Hypnerotosphere installation at the 2008 Venice Architecture Biennale (a collaboration with film maker John Maybury), the 2009 refurbishment of Middle and Over Wallop restaurants at Glyndebourne Opera House and the installation 'Picaresque', part of the 2012 exhibition Kama: Sesso e Design at the Triennale di Milano.

== Academic career ==
He was Unit Master at the Architectural Association from 1978 to 1988. From 1995 to 2011 he was Professor and Head of the Department of Architecture at the Royal College of Art and in 2011 was made Emeritus Professor. In 2012 Nigel Coates was awarded the RIBA Annie Spink Award in recognition of an outstanding contribution to architectural education. He is Chair of the Academic Court at the London School of Architecture.

== Personal life ==
Coates is gay, crediting his architectural style to "having to try extra hard to accept who I was." He has been called "the most prominent gay architect of his generation" by Simon Gedye, chair of the Sheffield Civic Trust.

== Related publications ==
- Nigel Coates, Narrative Break Up, ed. Nigel Coates and Bernard Tschumi, The Discourse of Events, AA Publications, 1983
- Nigel Coates ed., NATØ magazines Nos. 1 Albion, 1983; 2 Apprentice, 1984; 3 Gamma City, 1985, all AA Publications
- Nigel Coates, Street Signs, ed. John Thackara, Design After Modernism, Thames & Hudson, 1988
- Rick Poynor, Nigel Coates: The City in Motion, Fourth Estate, 1989
- Metropolis, Linda Brown and Deyan Sudjic, ICA 1988
- Nigel Coates, Ecstacity, AA Publications, 1992
- Jonathan Glancey, Body Buildings and City Scapes, Thames & Hudson, 1999
- Nigel Coates, Guide to Ecstacity, Laurence King, 2003
- Nigel Coates, Collidoscope, Laurence King 2004
- Alessandra Orlandi, Interview with Nigel Coates, The Plan 006, 2004
- Jenny Dalton, Coates of many Colours, How To Spend It, Financial Times, April 2009
- Aaron Betsky, Out There: Architecture Beyond Buildings, La Biennale di Venezia, 2008
- Guido Incerti, Interview with Nigel Coates, Klat magazine 05, Spring 2011
- Nigel Coates, Narrative Architecture, Wiley, 2012
- Kama: Sesso e Design, catalogue ed. Silvana Annicchiarico, Triennale Design Museum, 2012
- Marjanović and Howard, Drawing Ambience, RISD 2015
- Claire Jamieson: NATØ: Narrative Architecture in Postmodern London, Routledge, 2017
