= Luke Smalley =

American photographer

- Luke Smalley (from The New York Times Style Magazine)
- Born: John Luke Smalley; June 6, 1955; Pennsylvania, US
- Died: May 17, 2009 (aged 53); Pennsylvania, US
- Known for: Fine art and commercial photography
- Awards: 50 Books/50 Covers – AIGA; 2001 Gymnasium

Luke Smalley (June 6, 1955 – May 17, 2009) was an American photographer known for capturing boys in adolescence and as a talented art director famous for creating "playful images that explored the intersections between fashion and masculinity". His work, which pairs a coolly minimalist aesthetic with a retro nostalgia, centers around his tongue-in-cheek take on the journey for truth inside the lives of small town youth, especially athletic, all-American, young men. Many of the photographs are homoerotic, yet sexually ambivalent and never perverse. Images from his earlier collections were inspired by fitness manuals and yearbooks c. 1910. This is not surprising since Smalley graduated with a degree in sports medicine from Pepperdine University and worked for a number of years as a model and personal trainer. Smalley shot his artistic portraits in his home state of Pennsylvania. He used real high school athletes as models, who engaged in unusual competitions reinvented by the photographer, who also designed and crafted some of the outfits and equipments.

== Early life ==
Smalley was born on June 6, 1955, to parents Thomas J. Smalley Sr. and Julia Svatosky Smalley in Pennsylvania. He graduated from Rice Avenue Union High School in 1973. Following high school, he attended Hunter College and Northeastern University, before graduating with a degree in sports medicine from Pepperdine University. For the next several years, he worked as a model and personal trainer in California. His true love was photography, and he eventually became an independent Fine art and commercial photographer.

== Work ==
Smalley attained some notoriety outside of leading men's-wear image makers, and his commercial photography has appeared in both mainstream and niche market publications. He frequently collaborated and was friends with British designer Kim Jones. His art photography frequently featured the northwestern Pennsylvania town he called home until his death. He had gallery showings on both coasts and had four books of his photography published. After Smalley's sudden death the Smalley Partnership was formed for the purpose of continuing Luke Smalley's photographic legacy. The art gallery ClampArt, in the Chelsea district of New York City, currently represents the efforts of the Smalley Partnership. ClampArt

=== Clients ===
Smalley's photographs were used by:

- America
- American Eagle Outfitters
- The New York Times and T: The New York Times Style Magazine
- Tokion

They also appeared in several progressive men's fashion publications:

- Another Man
- Arena Homme +
- Dazed & Confused
- Ten Magazine
- V and VMAN magazines
- Vogue Hommes International

=== Bibliography ===
- Smalley, Luke (March 2001). Gymnasium. Santa Fe, New Mexico: Twin Palms Publishers. ISBN 978-0-944092-79-8.
  - According to Smalley, "The photographs in the gymnasium were taken primarily in western Pennsylvania between 1988 and 2000, though many people looking at them think their quirky compositions date them from the turn of the 20th century. When editing and sequencing the book, I wanted to resist any antique design conceits and, instead, present the images in a clean and direct manner."
  - His first book, Gymnasium was selected by AIGA as one of the best 50 Books/50 Covers in 2001.
  - He used real athletes from various Pennsylvania and Ohio high schools to act out a series of scenarios. The young athletes wore period outfits, used vintage equipment, and competed in unique competitions. Smalley crafted some of the outfits and equipment, taking care to design them with an authentic antique feel.
- Smalley, Luke (2004). Kim Jones. Santa Fe, New Mexico: Twin Palms Publishers. ASIN B000JK6HWG.
  - British menswear designer, Kim Jones, remembers collaborating with Smalley: "I remember shooting in an old Amish village with Luke during the winter — I think it must have been 15 degrees. The model, Ambrose Olsen, was freezing and shaking in the cold — he later told me that he wouldn’t have done it for anyone else except Luke because he was such a great guy." He continued, "Luke cared so much about everything in his work that everyone involved wanted to make anything happen for him. He was such a great talent who was underestimated by many, but I’m sure future generations will appreciate everything he’s done."
- Smalley, Luke (2007-12-25). Woody, Jack (ed.). Exercise at Home. Twin Palms Publishers. ISBN 978-1-931885-69-0.
  - Smalley revisits themes of adolescent growing pains acted out under the guise of earnest athleticism. He painstakingly coordinated the creation of the work, often making his own athletic equipment, props, and costumes. Instead of the anachronistic, turn-of-the-century black-and-white photos in Gymnasium, this book features all new color photos taken in northwestern Pennsylvania.
- Smalley, Luke (2009-09-30). Sunday Drive. Santa Fe, New Mexico: Twin Palms Press. ISBN 978-1-931885-82-9.
  - According to the publisher, "Girls left behind. Guys making bad choices. In his third book… photographer Luke Smalley continues his journey for truth inside the lives of small town youth. This poignant photo novella tells the story of consequence when innocence takes a wrong turn. Girls getting ready, girls getting anxious. Boys bored. Wide-eyed, raw off the football field. As in his past volumes, humor pervades: the sobering boys' plight is juxtaposed at Smalley's bemusement of the girls' preoccupation of what to wear."

=== Exhibitions ===
- 2002, Wessel + O’Connor Gallery, New York City, Gymnasium
- November 29, 2007 – February 2, 2008, Wessel + O’Connor Gallery, Brooklyn, New York, Exercise at Home
- October 25–November 6, 2008, The David Gallery, Los Angeles, California, Exercise at Home
- November 5 - December 19, 2009, ClampArt, New York City, Sunday Drive: A Memorial Exhibition
- April 2 – May 9, 2015, ClampArt, New York City, Luke Smalley: Retrospective
- November 29, 2018 – January 19, 2019, ClampArt, New York City, Luke Smalley: Exercise at Home

== Death ==
Smalley died unexpectedly on Sunday, May 17. 2009 at the age of 53. He is survived by two sisters, three brothers, four nieces, and four nephews. He is buried in St. John the Evangelist Catholic Church cemetery in Girard, Pennsylvania.
