= Institute of Advanced Architectural Studies =

Former architecture school of the University of York

The Institute of Advanced Architectural Studies (IoAAS), University of York, United Kingdom, was a post-graduate institute primarily specialising in providing mid-career education and research, largely for architects and others in related professions. The history and activities of the IoAAS are recorded by the Borthwick Institute for Archives, University of York, who also hold much documentary material. The Institute's activities were also recorded in the Vice Chancellor's Annual Reports to the University Court, typically. The Institute took a broad view of the nature of architecture that extended to management, building science, design problems in specialized building types, building economics, architectural history, conservation, landscape and townscape. Its target audience was the architectural and allied professions.

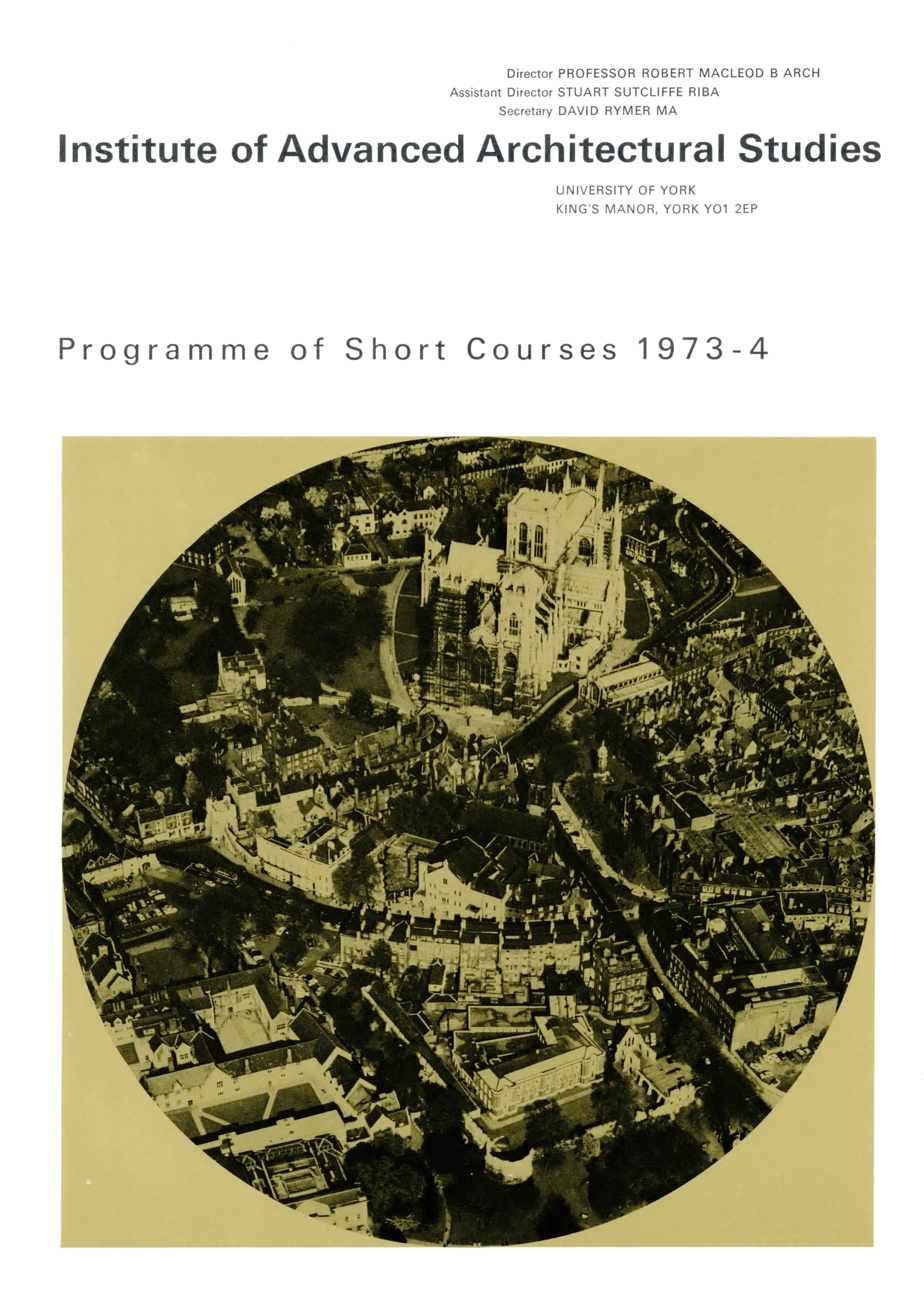
IoAAS Short Course Programme cover 1973 - 74

The Institute was constituted well before the university, being established by the York Academic Trust. It had its origins in a summer school for architectural students first held in 1949, followed by the holding of short residential courses for architects and other related disciplines. In 1961 the Institute was incorporated into the newly established University of York, moving into King’s Manor in 1966. Early proposals to establish an undergraduate school fell through, and the Institute remained a post-graduate establishment.

Through the University period the IoAAS had four Directors:

Professor Patrick Nuttgens 1962 to 1968

Professor Robert Macleod 1969 to 1974

Professor Douglass Wise 1975 to 1992

Professor John Worthington 1992 to 1997

The Assistant Director for most of this period was Stuart Sutcliffe. The Institute was widely supported by over thirty leading institutions, such as the RIBA (Royal Institute of British Architects), the RICS (Royal Institution of Chartered Surveyors) and the DoE (UK Department of the Environment). The IoAAS was closed in 1997, following a decline in demand especially for its short course programme, which in turn led to financial shortfalls.

== Sections of the IoAAS ==
The Institute was made up of a number of component parts:

Short Course Programme The IoAAS was perhaps best known in the architectural world for its series of short courses on all aspects of architectural work, including project management, building conservation, fire safety, design principles, maintenance etc. (See illustration above and reference). Although not called this in its day, the Institute in effect provided a substantial CPD (Continuing Professional Development) programme.

Conservation Studies A one year 'Diploma Course in Conservation Studies' was established. The first course was held in 1972, under the direction of the Radcliffe Lecturer in Conservation, Dr Derek Linstrum. He was succeeded by Peter Burman from 1990 to 2002, (from 1997 under the direction of the Department of Archaeology.) The course was later upgraded to an MA. Most leading UK architectural conservation specialists of the time lectured on the course. It grew to be one of the most respected such courses in the UK and indeed attracted many international students. Notable alumni included figures such as François LeBlanc, Director of the ICOMOS Secretariat (1979 - 1983).

Research Section The section was created to complement the IoAAS’s established educational role, under the direction of Dr Jeremy Taylor. As such, most of the research projects were centred on recognised activities of the Institute, such as the use of existing town housing stock, accommodation for undergraduates, the design of learning spaces and indeed evaluation of the need and provision of mid-career education. A typical report was 'Living over the shop: a guide to the provision of housing above shops in town centres, 1st report' (1990) written by Ann Petherick. Details of all reports can be found by searching the University of York Library.

Design Unit This architectural practice was established to complement especially the IoAAS’s short course programme. The Chief Architect was David Crease. In the early years in particular, it carried out a number of commissions for the University, including housing for the university's Heslington campus. As it had to be self-funding, later it became a more commercially orientated practice, with an emphasis on housing. A speciality became the design of GP’s Surgeries.

Parks and Gardens Following earlier research work on investigating the criteria for listing and conserving historic parks and gardens by Peter Goodchild, the ‘Centre for the Conservation of Historic Parks and Gardens’ was established in 1982. The Centre made an active contribution to the first official ‘Register of Historic Parks and Gardens in England’ which was published by English Heritage in 1984. From 1987, the Centre (later known as the Landscape Unit) focused on providing short mid-career courses and running the Historic Landscape Option in the MA in Conservation Studies. It also sponsored conferences and continued to promote the recording of historic parks and gardens and this, in due course, gave rise to the ‘Parks and Gardens UK Database’.

Photogrammetric Unit This Unit was part of the IoAAS from 1976 to 1991, under the direction of Ross W A Dallas. While largely a ‘production’ unit producing surveys for DAMHB (Directorate of Ancient Monuments and Historic Buildings) and its successor English Heritage, it also played an important role in the development, use and promotion of the technique of photogrammetry for producing elevation drawings of historic buildings in the UK.

Architectural Library From the days of the York Academic Trust, a substantial library of books, journals and AV materials relating to all aspects of architecture was established. This became part of the University’s main Library, while being housed in the King’s Manor and essentially servicing the requirements of the various students and sections of the IoAAS.

== Publications of the Institute ==
The IoAAS produced many substantial reports on various architectural themes, many sponsored by Government departments such as the Department of the Environment. The major reports were mostly produced by the Research Section and latterly as well by the Conservation Studies department. These reports are listed in the University of York Library catalogue, where full details of titles, authors, sponsors etc can be found. As well, many other minor publications are listed here.
