= Sarah Ichioka =

American urban planner and art curator

- Born: California, US
- Education: Yale University (BA); London School of Economics (MSc)

Sarah Ichioka is a British–American urbanist and writer based in Singapore. The founder of strategic consultancy Desire Lines, Ichioka is a proponent of regenerative design, biomimicry, and the incorporation of indigenous knowledge into urban planning. Ichioka served as the director of the Architecture Foundation, an independent center for urbanism and architecture in the United Kingdom from 2008 to 2014. In Singapore, Ichioka has advocated for the rewilding of green spaces as a strategy for increasing resilience and minimizing intensive management, and for the government to adopt more urgent language about addressing climate change.

== Works ==
- Flourish: Design Paradigms for Our Planetary Emergency (2022)
