= Allford Hall Monaghan Morris =

UK architecture firm

Allford Hall Monaghan Morris (AHMM)

Practice information
- Founders: Simon Allford; Jonathan Hall; Paul Monaghan; Peter Morris
- Founded: 1989
- Location: London, Bristol, Oklahoma City, Madrid and Sydney

Significant works and honors
- Awards: Stirling Prize 2015

Website
- www.ahmm.co.uk

Allford Hall Monaghan Morris (also known as AHMM) is the fourth-largest architecture practice in the United Kingdom with offices in London and Bristol, as well as international studios in Madrid, Sydney and Oklahoma City. AHMM was established in 1989 by Simon Allford, Jonathan Hall, Paul Monaghan and Peter Morris. The practice has since grown to more than 400 employees.

Among other awards, AHMM won the RIBA Stirling Prize in 2015 for Burntwood School, having been shortlisted for the Prize in 2008, 2009 and 2011.

== History ==
Founded in 1989 by Simon Allford, Jonathan Hall, Paul Monaghan and Peter Morris, who met at the Bartlett School of Architecture, the practice employs over 400 people working on projects in education, healthcare, housing, arts and offices. In 2017, it became majority employee-owned through an employee ownership trust.

In March 2020, the Twentieth Century Society criticised AHMM's "heavy-handed" plans to revamp Denys Lasdun's IBM building on London's South Bank. Some five years later, the same organisation, plus Historic England, criticised AHMM's "harmful" proposals for another Lasdun-designed London building, Milton Gate.

During the first year of the COVID-19 pandemic, AHMM reported a 22% drop in revenue from £55.3 million in 2020 to £43.3m in 2021, and an operating loss of £587,000 (compared to a profit of over £6m in 2020). Average employee headcount in the year to 30 March 2021 was 486. It made further losses in the next two financial years—£1.0m in 2021–22 and £1.9m in 2022–23—while 2023 revenue rebounded to £49.9m. During the year to March 2024, AHMM cut 129 jobs (422 staff remained) at a cost of over £3m, and reported a fourth consecutive annual loss of £1.4m on global revenue of £46m (£41m deriving from the UK).

In August 2020, Simon Allford was elected to be president of the Royal Institute of British Architects; serving a two-year term, he succeeded Alan Jones on 1 September 2021. In early April 2022, a RIBA walking tour of London's Barbican Estate was ambushed by residents protesting against AHMM's involvement in a 24-storey tower at Houndsditch, claiming it will cause loss of light to flats and community amenity areas. A leaflet asserted: "Allford used his RIBA position to push forward plans that will blight the lives of Middlesex Street Estate residents in the east of the City."

In September 2025, residents of an AHMM-designed building—a 35-storey tower block, The Fold, completed in 2022 in Croydon, south London—were told they must leave the building after fire safety issues were found.

== In media ==
In his April 2023 review of Tower Hamlets Town Hall for The Observer, architecture critic Rowan Moore describes Allford Hall Monaghan Morris as:

architects who have always prospered by combining high levels of pragmatism and skill with, on occasion, invention and flair. They design some of the best office blocks around, but also public buildings such as the Stirling prize-winning Burntwood School in south London. They also have a record of making over older buildings, as with their headquarters for the Metropolitan Police at New Scotland Yard and their conversion into homes and hotel of the BBC’s former Television Centre in White City.

== Notable projects ==
AHMM's notable projects include:

- Walsall Bus Station, Walsall (2000)
- Unity Buildings, Liverpool (2006)
- Westminster Academy, Westminster, London (2007)
- Saatchi Gallery, Chelsea, London (2008)
- Chobham Academy, Stratford, London (2013)
- Burntwood School, Wandsworth, London (2014)
- Willesden Green Library, Brent, London (2015)
- New Scotland Yard, Westminster, London (2016)
- Oklahoma City Ballet, Oklahoma City (2017)
- Royal Court Theatre, Liverpool (2018)
- Television Centre, Hammersmith and Fulham, London (2018)
- @sohoplace Theatre, Westminster, London (2022)
- Tower Hamlets Town Hall, Tower Hamlets, London (2023)
- Assembly, Bristol (2024)

== Awards ==
AHMM won the RIBA Stirling Prize in 2015 for Burntwood School, and has received many other awards and public and media acclaim for its work. The practice was also shortlisted for the RIBA Stirling Prize in 2008 for Westminster Academy, in 2009 for the Kentish Town Health Centre, and in 2011 for the Angel Building.

- British Construction Industry Award (BCIA) for the category of Building Project between £3-50m, 2002
- RIBA London Building of the Year, 2008
- CABE’s Building for Life Award, 2008
- GLA London Planning Awards for Best New Place to Live, 2008
- Housing Design Award, 2008
- BCIA Building Project Award, 2009
- AIA Award for Architecture, 2010
- Civic Trust Award, 2010
- London Planning Awards Best New Public Space 2010
- BCIA Local Authority Award, 2011
- RIBA Stirling Prize 2015
- LIFT Award for Best Design for a Healthcare Project
