= Bosideng =

Chinese clothing company

Bosideng International Holdings Limited 波司登国际控股有限公司
- Type: Public
- Traded as: SEHK: 3998
- Industry: Clothing
- Founded: 1975
- Headquarters: Shanghai, China
- Area served: China
- Key people: Chairman: Mr. Gao Dekang, Creative Director: Kim Jones
- Products: Down clothing
- Website: www.bosideng.com

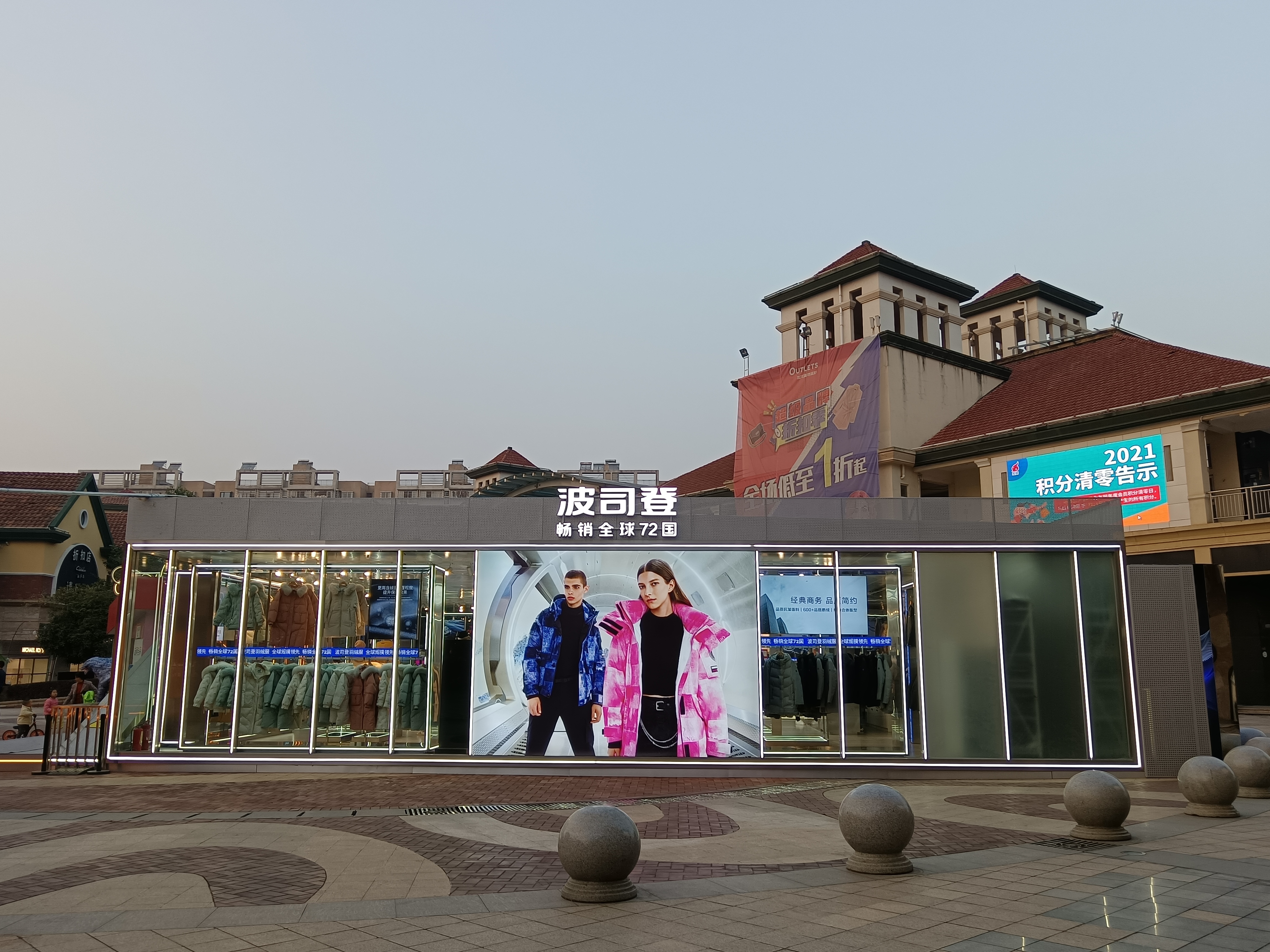
A Bosideng store in Changsha, China in December 2021

Bosideng (Chinese: 波司登), officially Bosideng International Holdings Limited (Chinese: 波司登國際控股有限公司), is the largest down clothing company in the PRC. It sells down clothing under its six core brands Bosideng, Snow Flying, Kangbo, Bengen (previously known as Bingjie), Shuangyu and Shangyu. Through these brands, the group offers a wide range of clothing products targeting various consumer segments. In 2023, Bosideng was ranked 462nd in the World's 500 Most Influential Brands list published by World Brand Lab.

== Overview ==
According to the China Industrial Information Issuing Center (CIIIC), in terms of sales in 2010, Bosideng, Snow Flying, Kangbo and Bengen down clothing products achieved a combined market share of 36.7% in the PRC. "Bosideng" was the leading down clothing brand in the PRC for 16 consecutive years from 1995 to 2010, according to CIIIC and the National Bureau of Statistics of China. The group introduced, for 15 consecutive years, the latest fashionable Fall/Winter clothing trends to the world on behalf of the PRC at the "China International Clothing and Accessories Fair".

== Products ==
The group has adopted a "non-seasonal product" development strategy. Currently, the non-down clothing products of the Group include Bosideng MAN, BOSIDENG RICCI lady's wears casual wear and D.D. Cat kids wear, VETALLO high-class menswear, and the franchise project of ROCAWEAR in the Greater China region.

In October 2025, Bosideng announced that Kim Jones is appointed as the Artistic Director of Bosideng's new high-end urbanwear line Areal.

== Expansion ==
Bosideng has expanded its menswear operations in China, operating retail outlets across the country. Its Rocawear franchise in Greater China has opened consignment counters in cities such as Beijing, Shanghai, and Hangzhou. The company has also considered acquisitions to increase the share of non-down clothing in its sales.

Beyond China

In 2017, the brand began to think global, starting to show their designs at international fashion weeks, including New York, Milan and London. In 2024, the company invested in Canadian outdoor brand Moose Knuckles, buying a 30% stake in the company. In July of that year, the company showed their "Fusion" collection in Paris.

In May 2025, the company gained attention when Bloomberg erroneously reported the company's market cap to be worth more than $6,000 trillion USD, valuing it as the world's most valuable company.
