= Christ's College, Guildford =

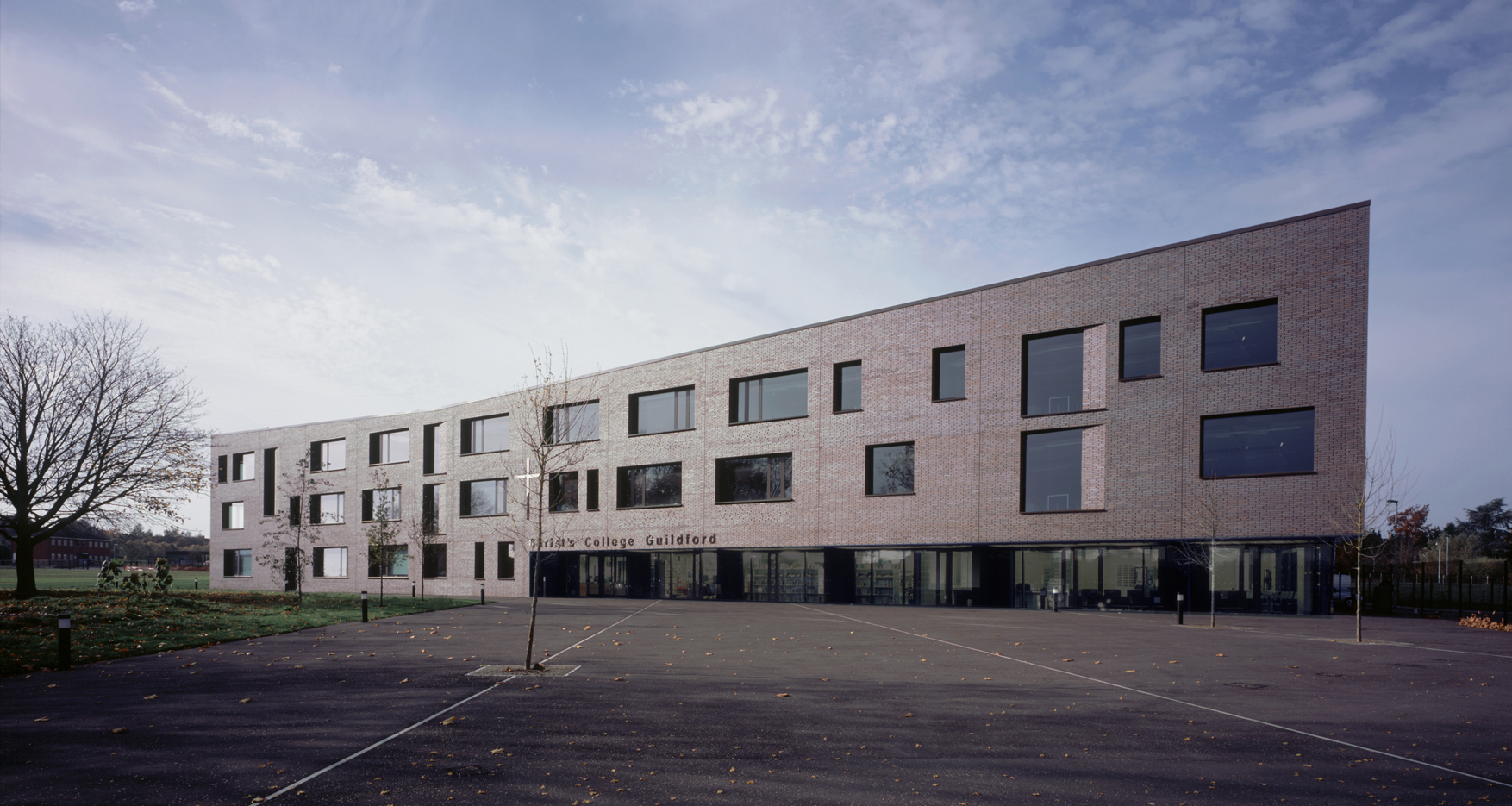

Location
- Larch Avenue; Guildford, Surrey, GU1 1JY; England; 51.25559°N 0.58106°W

Information
- Type: Academy
- Religious affiliation: Church of England
- Established: 2003
- Local authority: Surrey County Council
- Department for Education URN: 142490 Tables
- Ofsted: Reports
- Chair: Stuart Zissman
- Head teacher: Matthew Goulborn
- Staff: 107
- Gender: Mixed
- Age: 11 to 16
- Enrolment: PAN 780
- Houses: Austin, Redgrave, Turner, Sibley
- Colours: Red, green, yellow, blue
- Website: www.christscollege.surrey.sch.uk

Christ's College is an age 11 to 16 secondary school administered by the Church of England that serves the Bellfields neighborhood of Guildford, Surrey, and England.

The school was previously called Larch Avenue School but renamed to Bishop Reindorp School. The school has been called Christ's College Guildford since 2003. Previously a voluntary aided school administered by Surrey County Council, in December 2015 Christ's College converted to academy status and joined the Good Shepherd Trust. The Good Shepherd Trust is a family of 16 churches and community schools within the Diocese of Guildford. The College continues to coordinate with Surrey County Council for admissions.

The main intake of students is from the area surrounding the school, but the school attracts students from as far as Woking and Ash.

== New building ==
In January 2007, an archaeological evaluation by the Surrey County Archaeological Unit took place during the fieldwork for the development of the new school buildings. Bronze Age flint work and Roman pottery were found during the excavations. The archaeological discoveries made at Christ's College, are of great significance for both the local area and wider region.

In 2008, the College moved to the new building which was designed by DSDHA with an exceptionally high standard of teaching spaces and facilities. The new building cost about £20 million and was shortlisted for the RIBA Stirling Prize in early 2010 where the school was described as a 'small city' with the main atrium being the 'town square'.

On 23 June 2009 the college was formally opened by the Duke of Edinburgh. To commemorate his visit, the Theatre within Christ's College was officially named, “The Duke of Edinburgh Theatre”.

== Ofsted & SIAMS Inspections ==
In October 2022, Christ's College was inspected by Ofsted and was rated "Good" in all areas. In the report, it says "Christ’s College is an inclusive school that has been transformed by its current senior leaders". Students and their parents typically enthuse about the improvements. One parent said, "The school has made massive strides forward since the appointment of the current principal, and standards, expectations and behavior have improved drastically."

Following on from the Ofsted inspection in November 2022, the college also took part in a SIAMS Inspection. The SIAMS inspection explores the question, “How effective is the school's distinctive Christian vision, established and promoted by leadership at all levels, in enabling pupils and adults to flourish?” and the college was graded "Excellent" overall. "The school's thoroughly inclusive Christian vision is lived out in all aspects of its work. This has a transformational impact across the school community. All understand and practice the school's five core values which are rooted in its Christian vision. As a result of the exceptionally strong sense of family promoted by school leaders, students flourish at Christ's College. All are empowered to be their best selves, particularly those vulnerable students and those with additional needs, who are given sensitive, targeted support."

In the 2019 report, the college was graded as 'requires improvement' by Ofsted on the grounds that pupils' outcomes had declined since 2013 and the 'progress of disadvantaged pupils and middle-ability pupils [was] well below average across a broad range of subjects." The inspection found that though improving pupils attendance is well below average and students behavior disrupted lessons; staff did not apply the new expectations for behavior consistently and did not feel supported when changes were made to school procedures and practices. The report also states that the 'quality of teaching is too variable across the school' and that 'teaching does not suitably challenge pupils from their different starting points.'

In 2013, the college was inspected by Ofsted again and was graded as 'Good', the number of pupils being 649 with 37 in the sixth form. This grading was an improvement on the college's previous one of 'satisfactory' with the Inspectors being impressed with the pupil's progress from Year 7 and the ethos of the college which 'promotes learning'. The exam results from the summer exams gave an average value added score for pupils, which was one of the best in the county.

== College Houses ==
The college has four houses; Austen, Redgrave, Turner and Sibley. Each house is led by a Student House Leader and a Staff House Leader. Students are assigned a house when they start in Year 7.
