= Burntwood School =

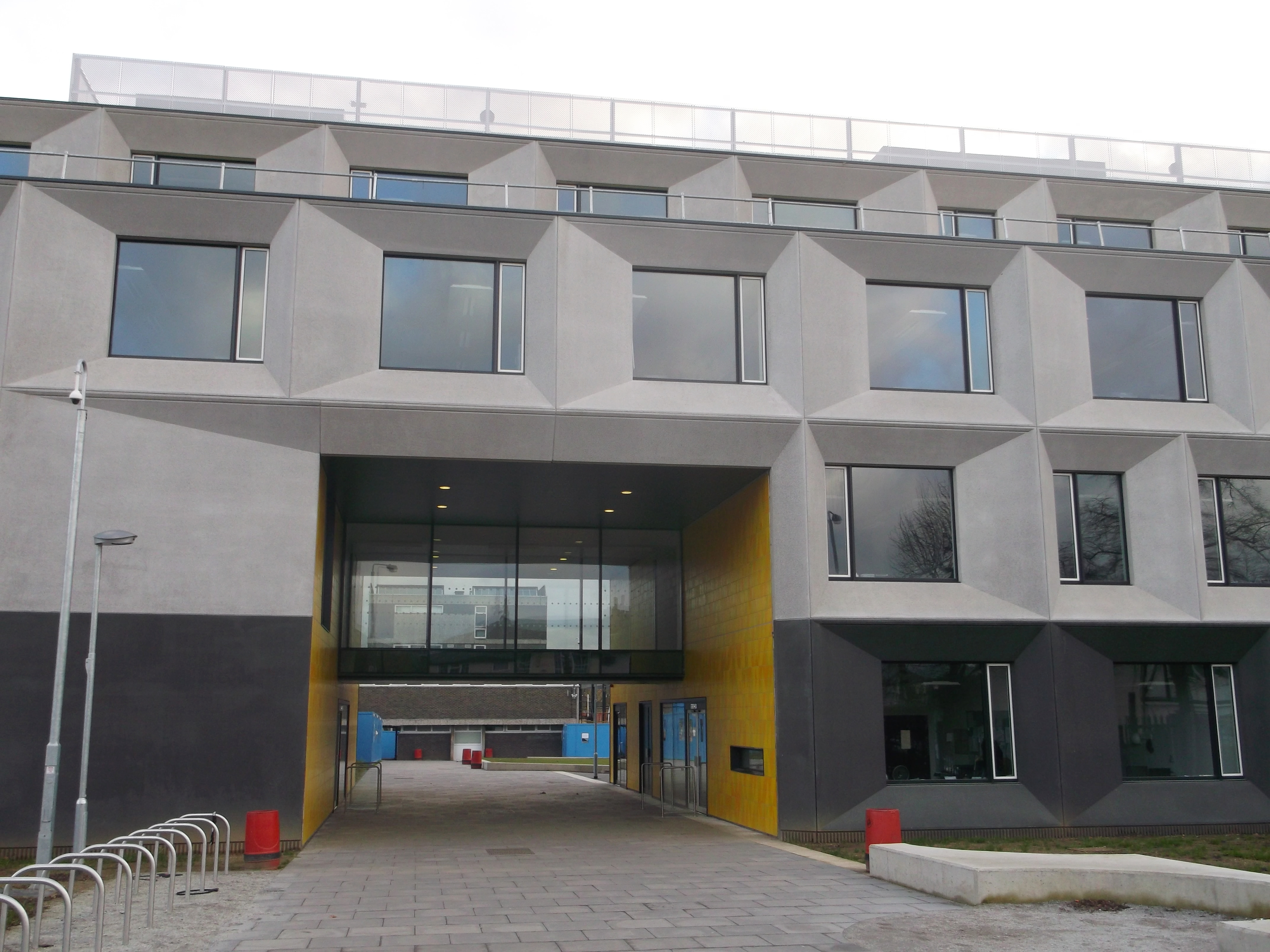

Location
- Burntwood Lane; Tooting, London, SW17 0AQ; England; 51.4375°N 0.1796°W

Information
- Type: Academy
- Motto: The Best Education Today for the Women of Tomorrow.
- Established: September 1986; 39 years ago
- Department for Education URN: 139842 Tables
- Ofsted: Reports
- Principal: Helen Shorrock
- Gender: Girls (Mixed Sixth Form)
- Age: 11 to 18
- Enrolment: 1800
- Colours: Red & grey
- Website: www.burntwoodschool.com

Burntwood School is a girls' secondary school and sixth form with academy status, located in Wandsworth, London, England, opened in September 1986. It is one of the largest state schools for girls at the secondary level in the country.

== History ==
The school opened in September 1986, replacing Garratt Green Comprehensive Girls' School, which had formerly occupied the site, and nearby Mayfield School for Girls. The first headmistress of Burntwood was Brigid Beattie-Moriarty. Her obituary in The Guardian called the school "an outstanding centre of multi-cultural education".

The school converted to academy status on 1 July 2013.

Burntwood School is recognised as a Science Specialist School and has the 'Sportsmark' and 'Artsmark Gold' awards. It has also received the Rights Respecting UNICEF Gold Award.

== Enrolment ==
For the 2008–09 school year, there were 1,733 pupils enrolled at the school. In September 2009, the school admitted 283 new students: 71 places are offered to the girls who scored highest in the Wandsworth Year 6 Test; the remaining 212 places are offered to siblings of current students and then to those girls living closest to the school.

While nominally an all-girls school, Burntwood has a small number of male students in the sixth form. In 2002, for example, two per cent of the pupils were male.

== Buildings ==
For the school year beginning September 2012, students moved into the new buildings which had been under construction for the last two years. Fully complete in 2014, the project that cost £40.9 million saw the opening of six new buildings (four four-storey teaching pavilions, a new sports hall and a new performing arts buildings) to create a new-look campus.

In October 2015, Burntwood School won the RIBA Stirling Prize, the UK's leading architecture award.

== Notable former pupils ==
- Clara Amfo, BBC Radio 1 presenter and DJ.
- Amplify Dot (Ashley Charles), Rapper and Radio DJ.
- Pearl Mackie, actress, Doctor Who companion.
- Jessica Plummer, singer in Neon Jungle (2013-2015) and actress, EastEnders.
