= St Mary Magdalene, Paddington =

Church in Paddington, London

Coordinates: 51.5225°N 0.1891°W

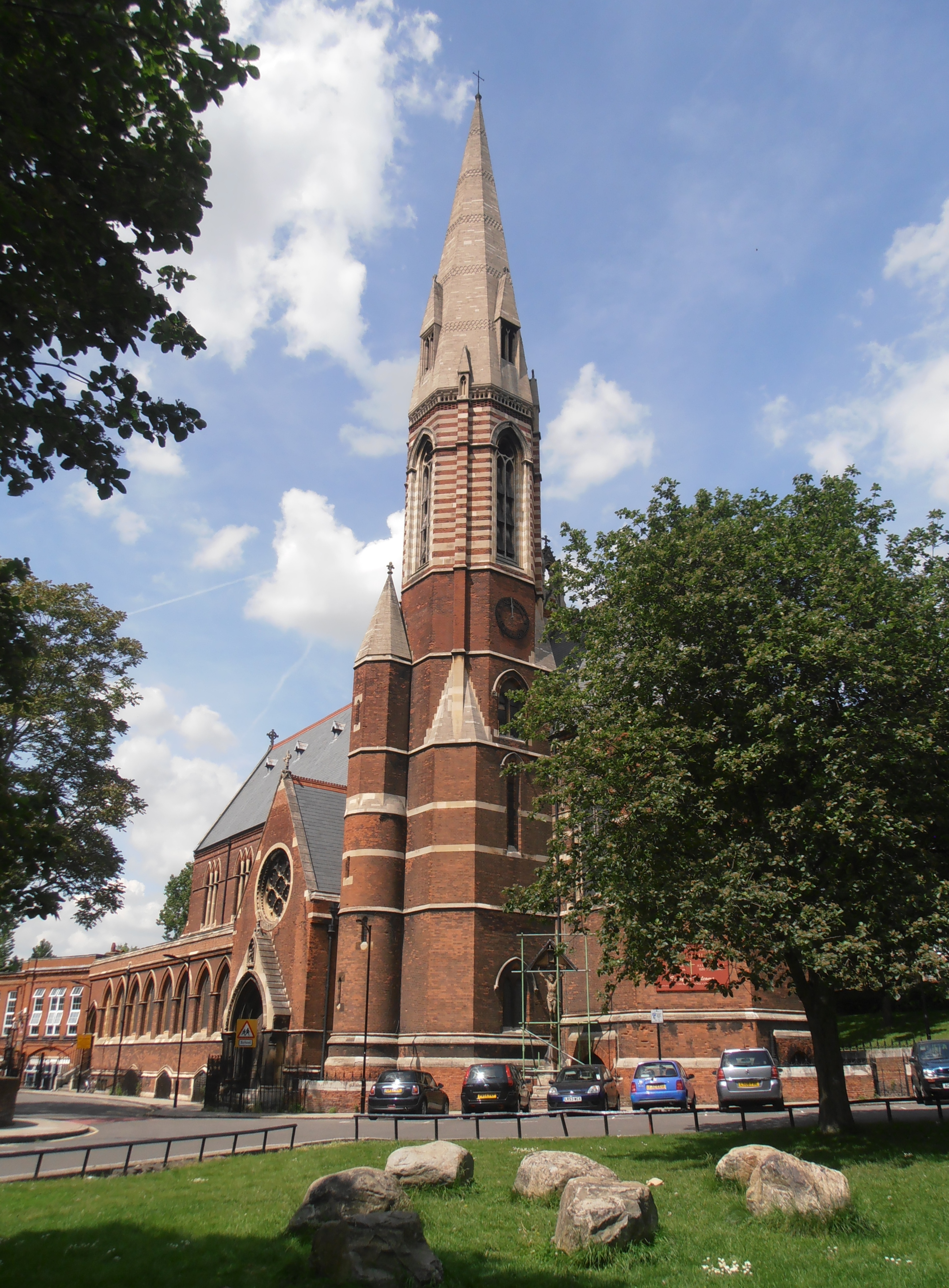
St Mary Magdalene

St Mary Magdalene, Paddington, is a Grade I listed Anglican church at Rowington Close, London, dedicated to Jesus' follower, Saint Mary Magdalene.

The parish was established in 1865 and work on the church started in 1867. Although complete in 1872 (154 years ago), a fire destroyed the brand new roof so the first Mass in the new building could not be celebrated until St Mary Magdalene's Day, 22 July 1873. The church was consecrated after completion of interior decoration on 21 October 1878 (148 years ago).

The architect was George Edmund Street, and this church is considered to be his masterpiece. It includes notable stained glass by Henry Holiday, Salviati mosaics, sculptures by Thomas Earp, a later crypt chapel by Ninian Comper, and a War Memorial by Martin Travers.

The painted ceiling of the nave, the work of Daniel Bell, was cleaned and restored during 2018–19, with the help of a grant from the Lottery Heritage Fund. With assistance from the Paddington Development Trust, an extension was also built, containing additional spaces and facilities intended for use by the wider local community.

== Cultural associations ==
St Mary Magdalene is thought to be the church that inspired the composer John Ireland to become an Anglo-Catholic. The novelist Barbara Pym was a member of the congregation in 1971–72, while living in Queen's Park. P. D. James is thought to have used the church as a model for one of the locations in her novel A Taste for Death.

The church and surrounding neighbourhood were used as a location in the 1968 movie Secret Ceremony with Elizabeth Taylor. Scenes from the 2012 film of Les Misérables were also filmed there.

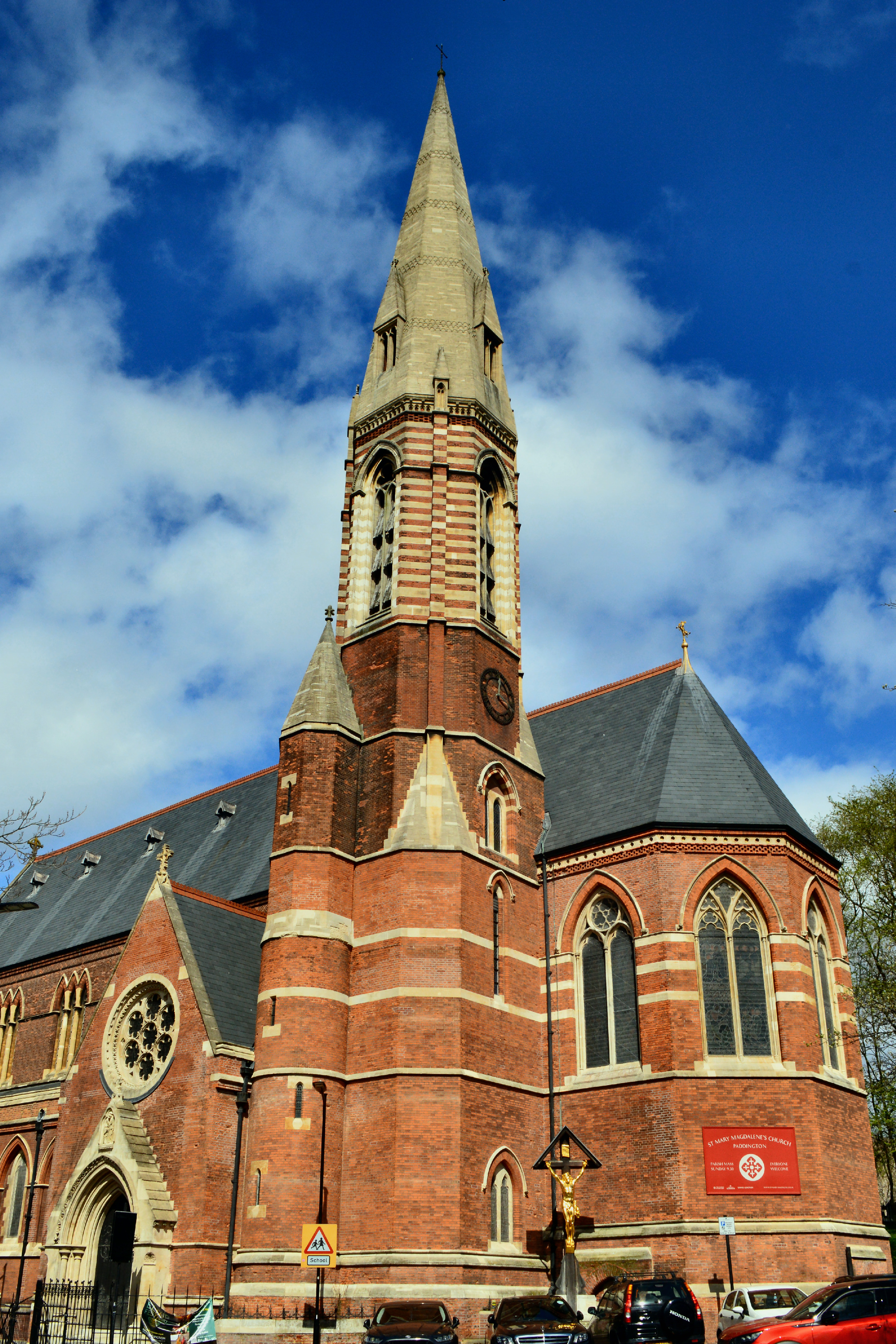
St Mary Magdalene

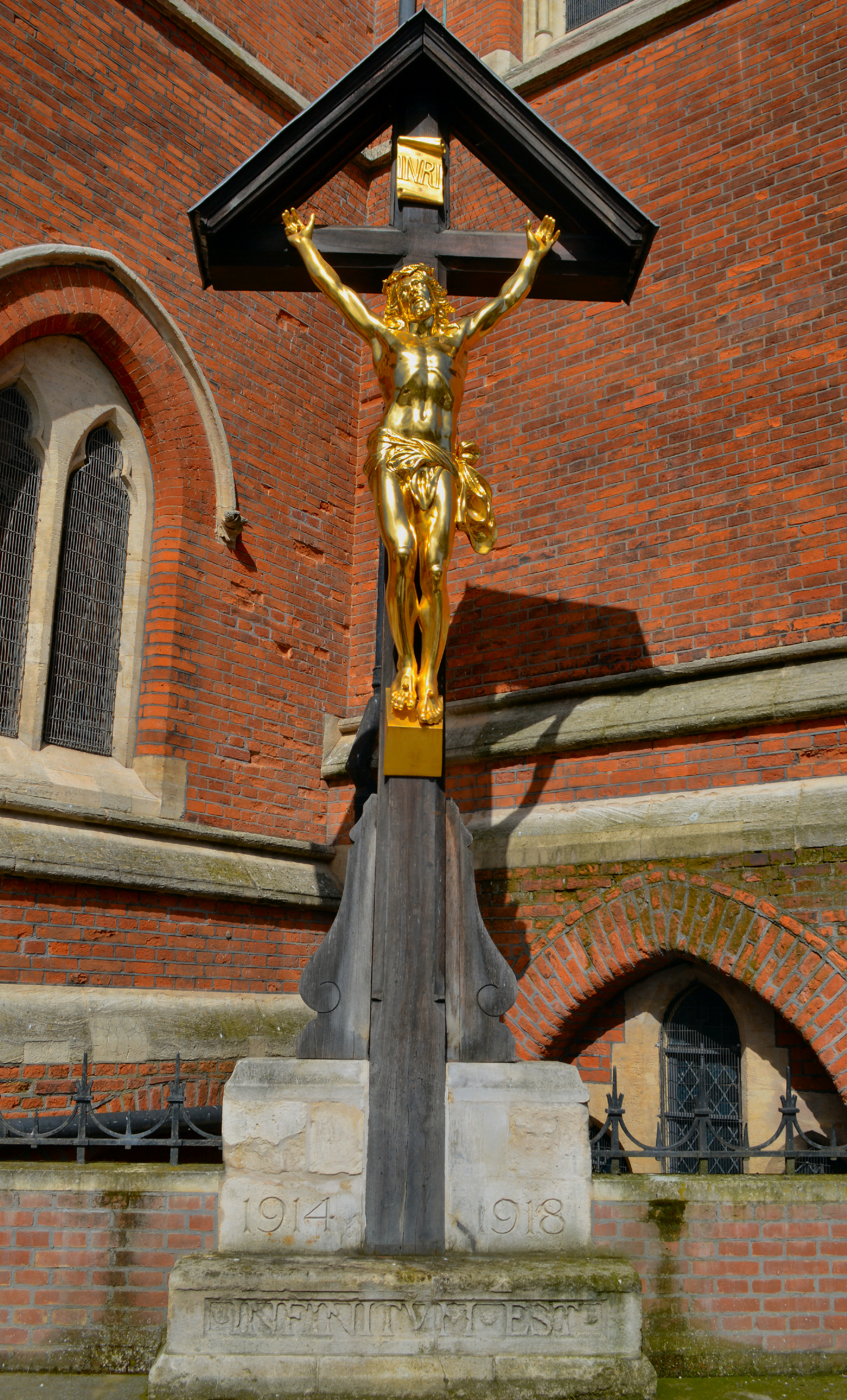
War Memorial by Martin Travers

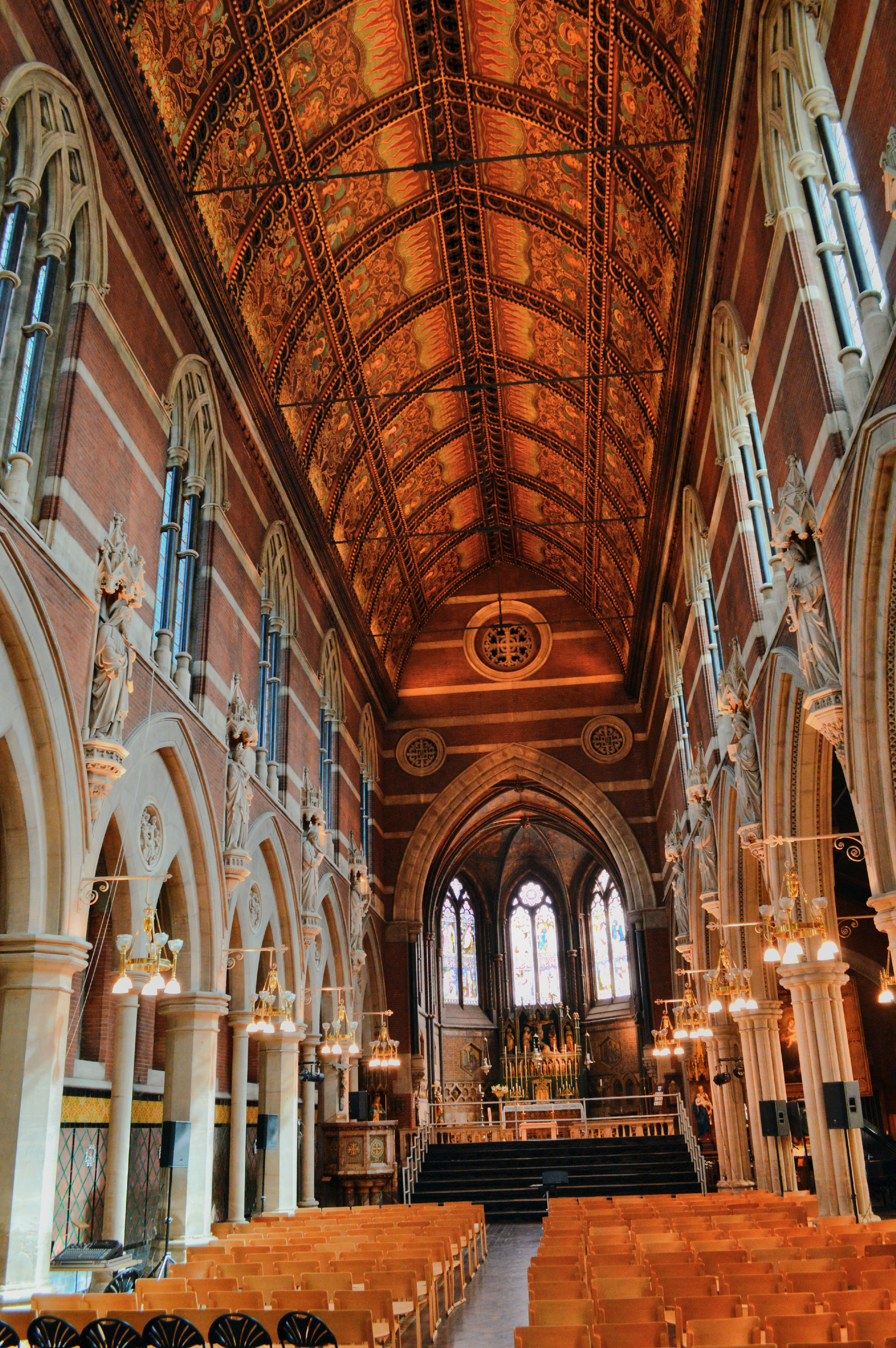
The nave with sculptures by Thomas Earp

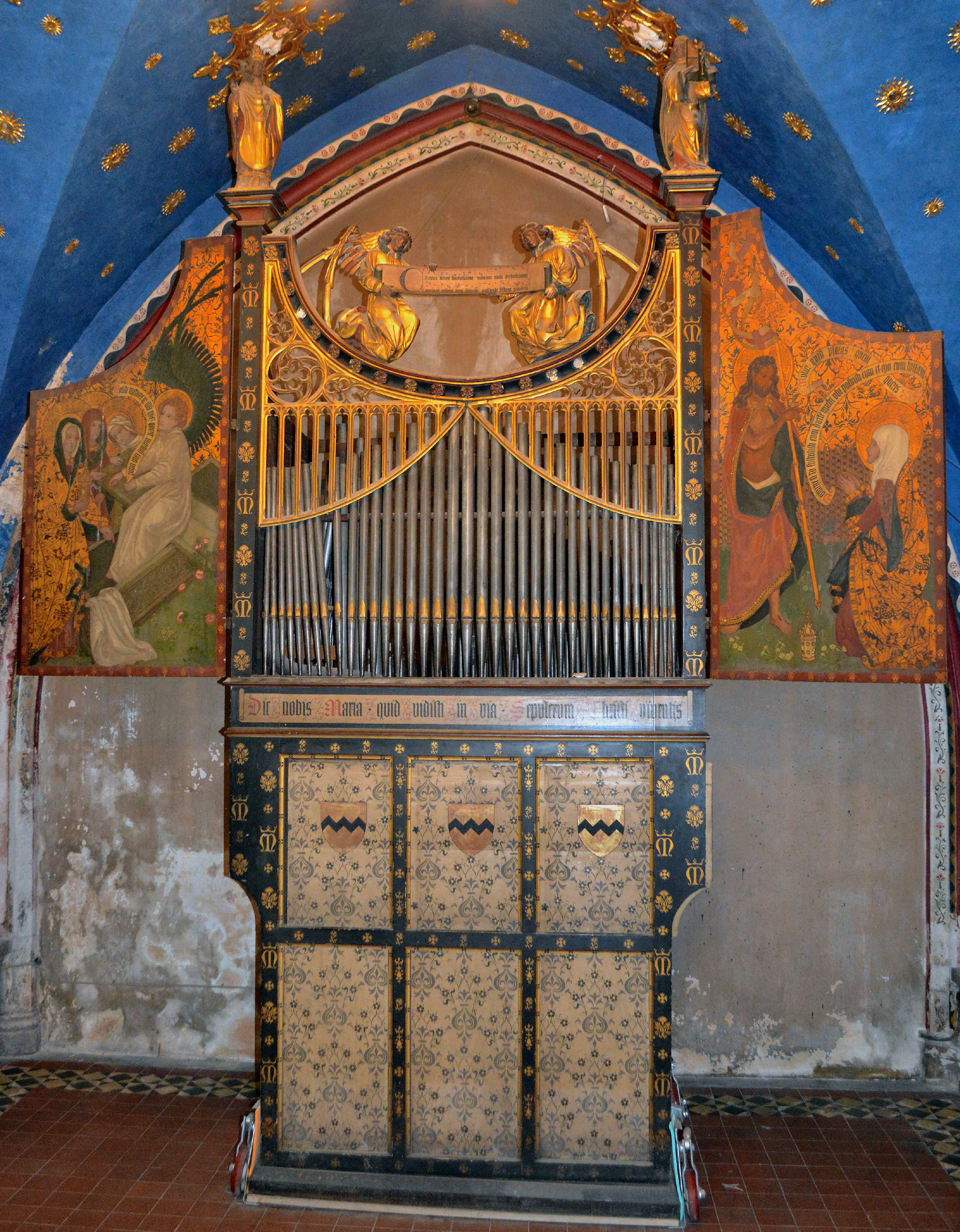
Chapel of St Sepulchre, organ

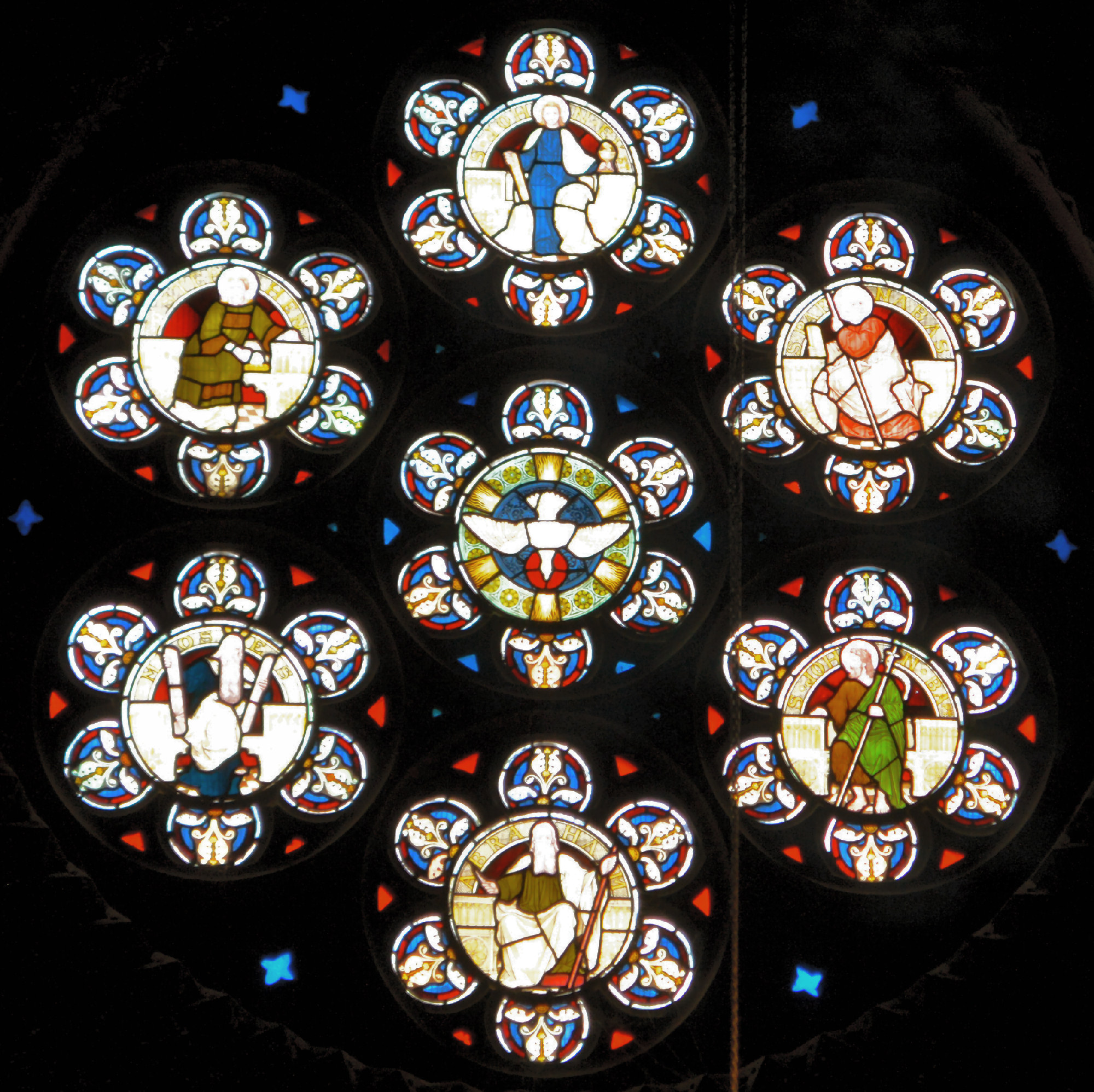
Stained glass by Henry Holiday
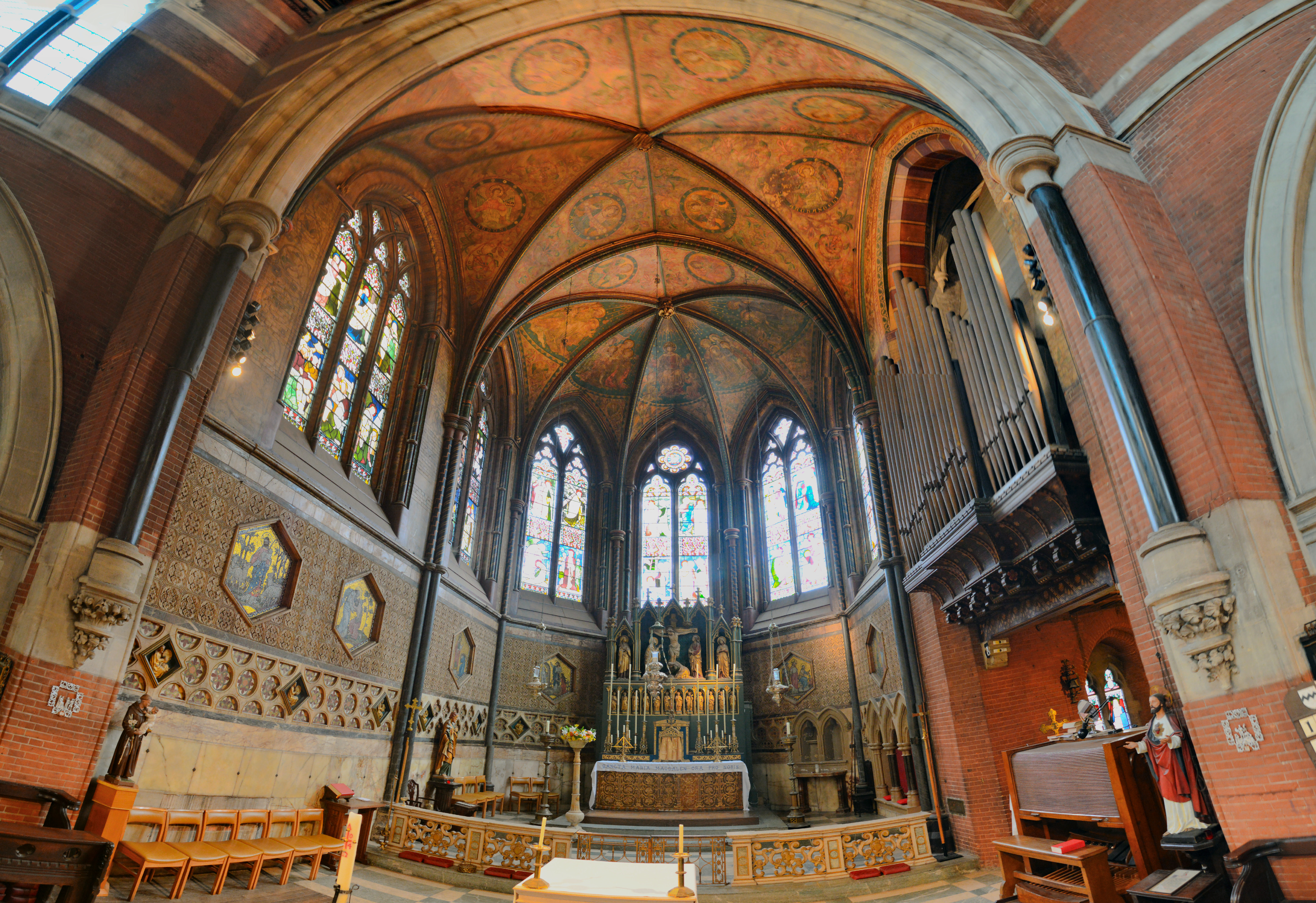
Chancel

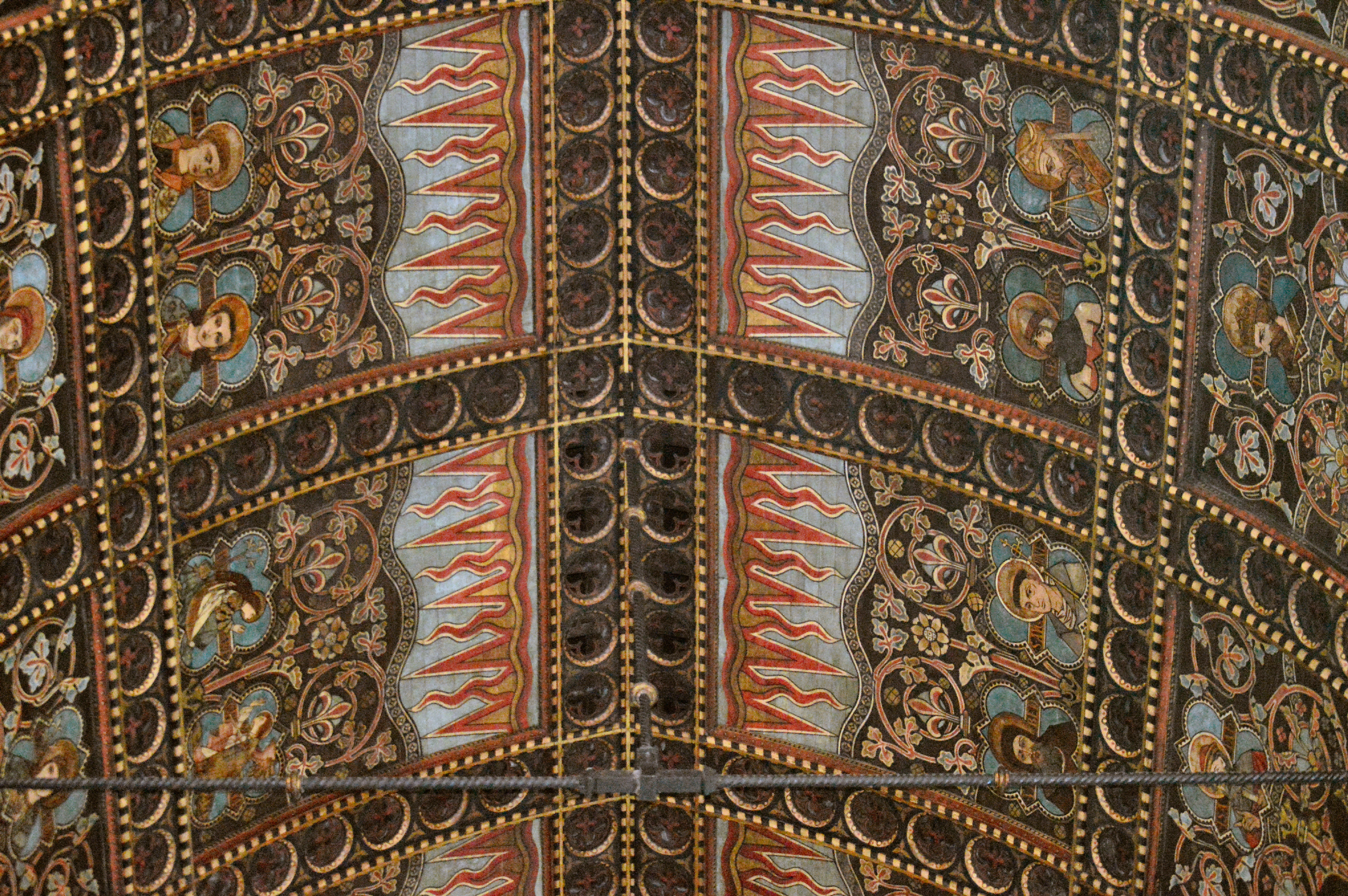
Nave ceiling by Daniel Bell

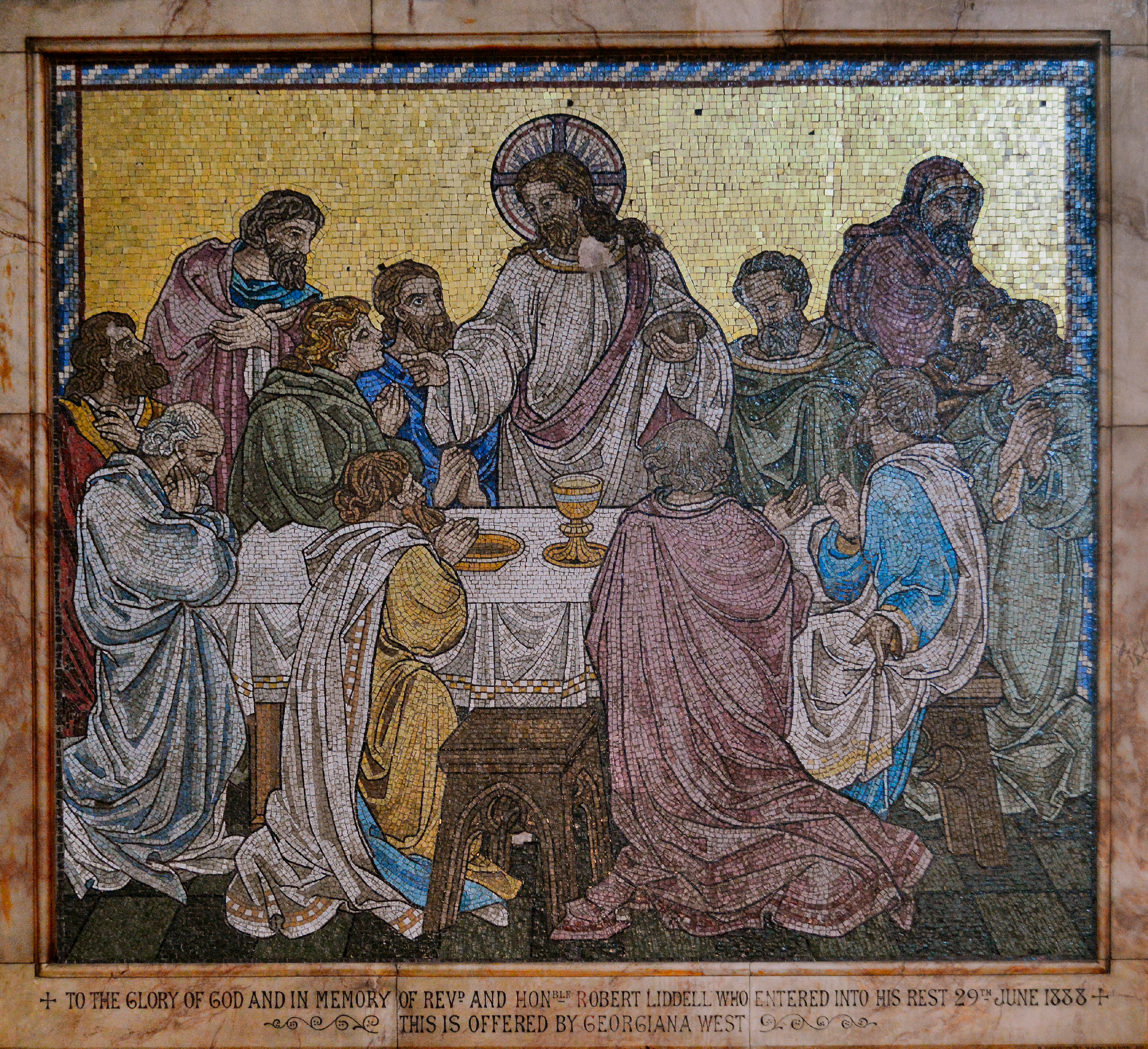
Salviati mosaic

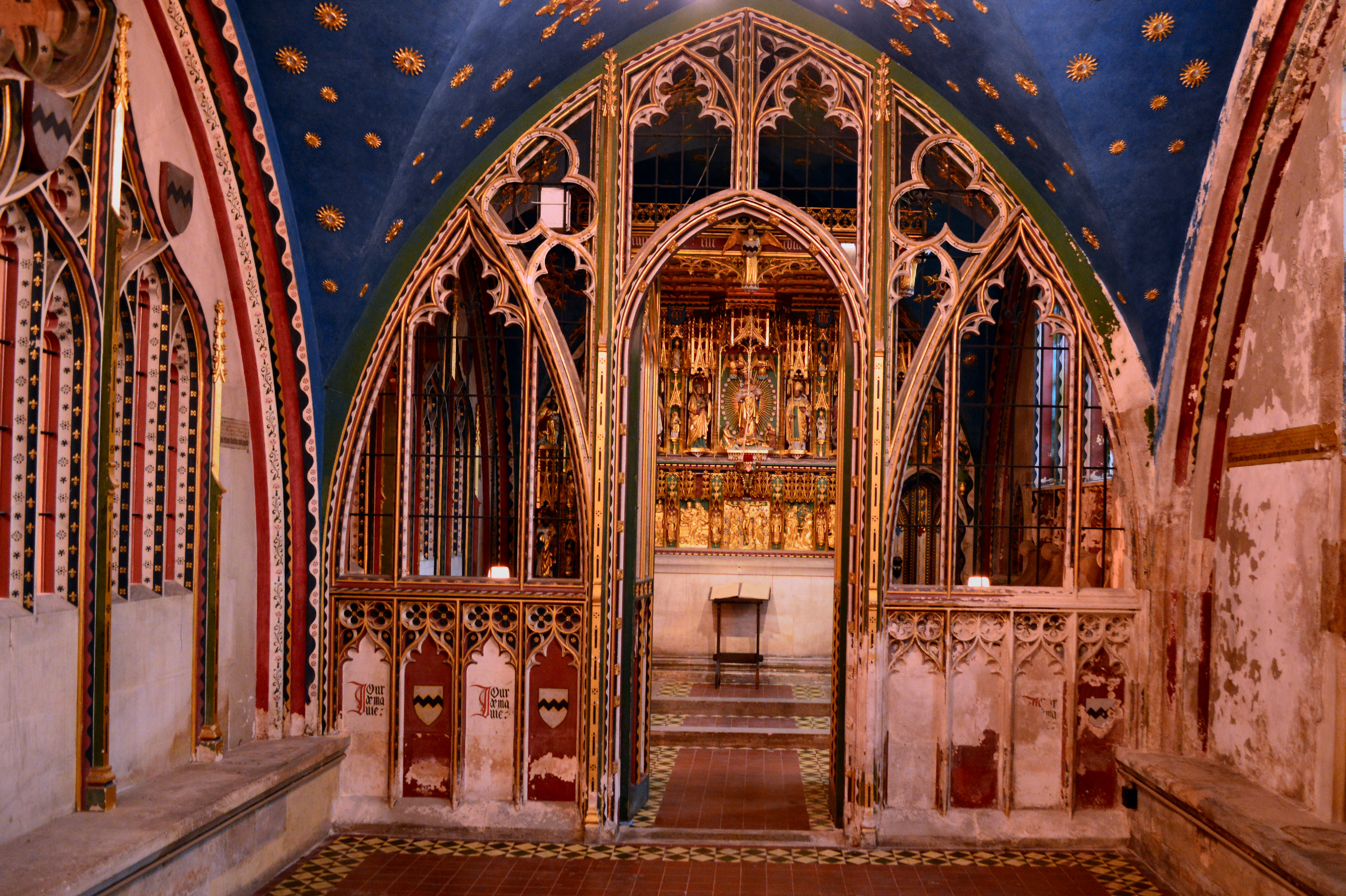
Chapel of St Sepulchre by Sir Ninian Comper
