= Daniel Bell (artist) =

English church decorative artist

- Born: 1840; Silton, Dorset, U.K.
- Died: 1915 (aged 74–75); Willesden, London, U.K.
- Known for: Stained glass painter and sculptor
- Notable work: See below

Daniel Bell (1840–1915) was a British church decorative artist and sculptor born in Silton, Dorset and died in Willesden.

== Early life ==
Bell was the younger brother of Alfred Bell (1832–1895) of Clayton and Bell. In 1861 he was living with and assisting his brother Alfred in St Pancras, London.

== Career ==
He went on to start in business on his own, making stained glass and church fittings, forming partnerships with James Redfern and the architect Richard Almond (1841–87). Bell, Redfern and Almond, 'Sculptors and Glass Painters', were located in Charlotte Street, Portland Place. By 1871 Daniel and his family were still living in St Pancras, giving his occupation as 'Glass & Mural Painter & Sculptor'; he employed 16 men and 11 boys. The partnership with Redfern ended in 1868 and ended with Almond in 1872. By 1878 he was working by himself in Margaret Street and two years later in Bolsover Street. In 1881 the family lived in Hammersmith and in 1891 and 1901 in Paddington, describing himself as 'Decorative Artist' or 'Ecclesiastical Artist'. By 1911 he was retired.

== Personal life ==
In 1864 he married Mary Cobbe (b 1843, Bengal, India) at St Mary Magdalene's, Munster Square. They had nine children. Bell died 1915 in Willesden.

== Gallery ==
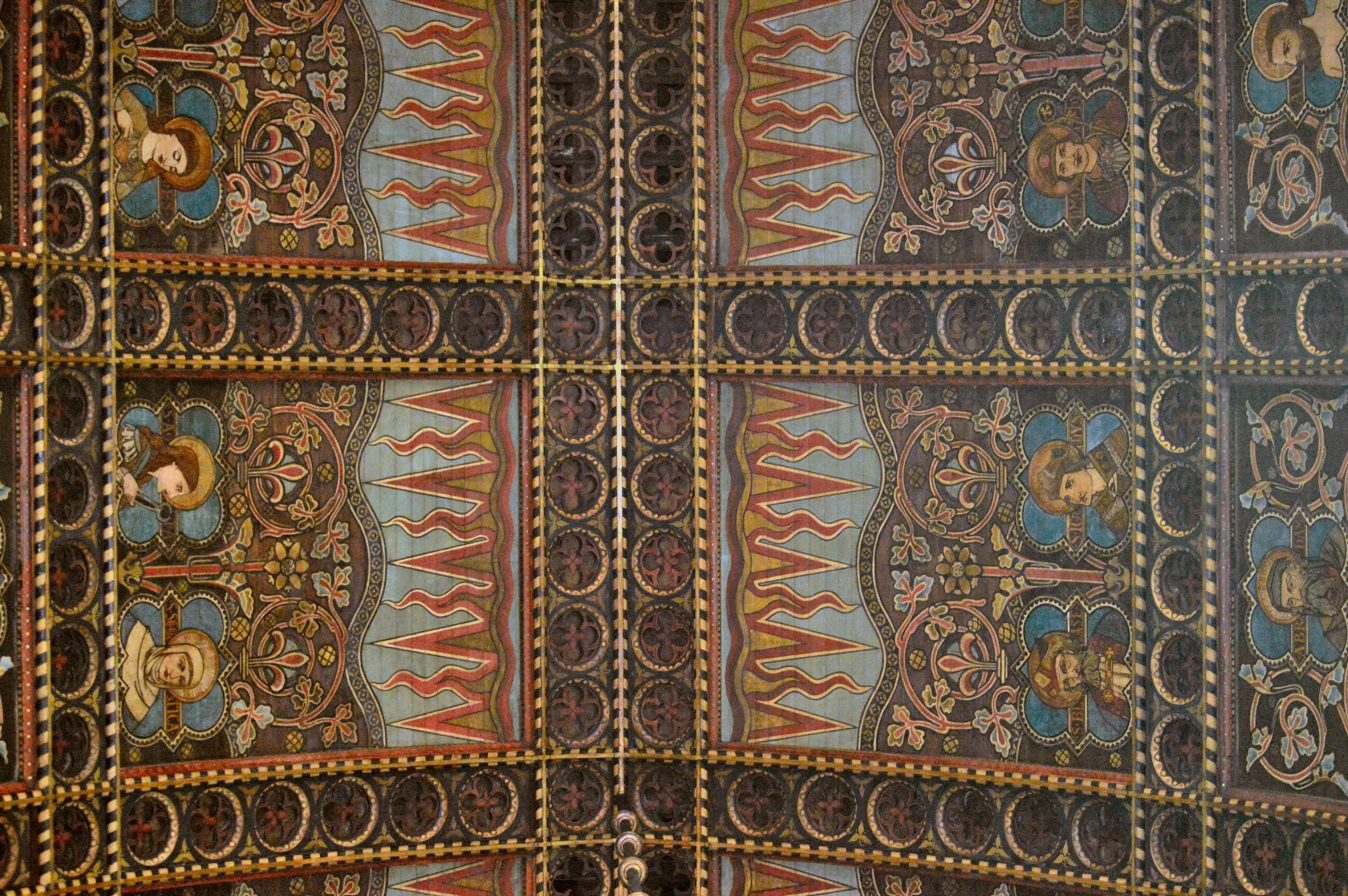
Nave ceiling, St Mary Magdalene, Paddington

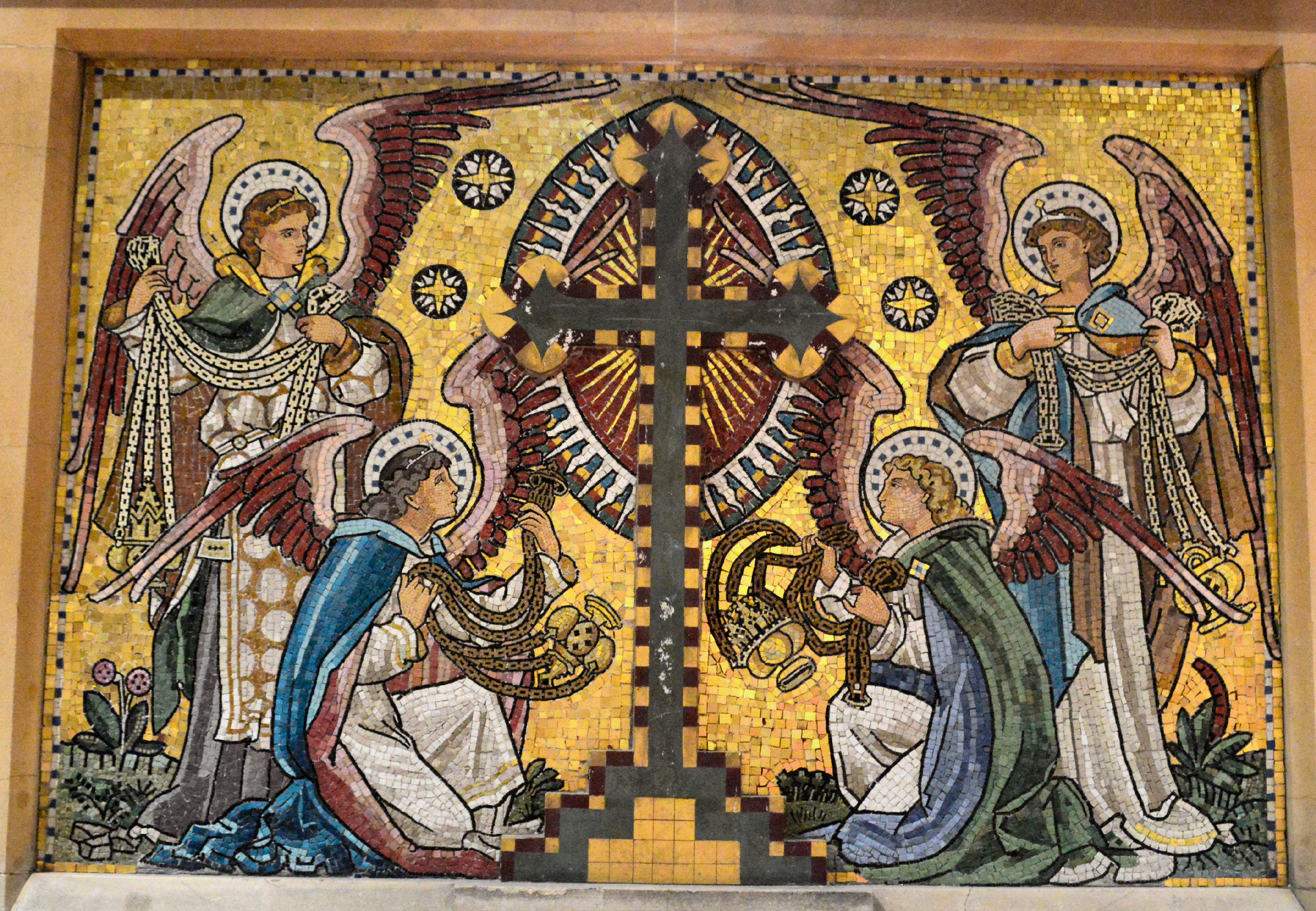
Mosaic, Grove Gardens Chapel

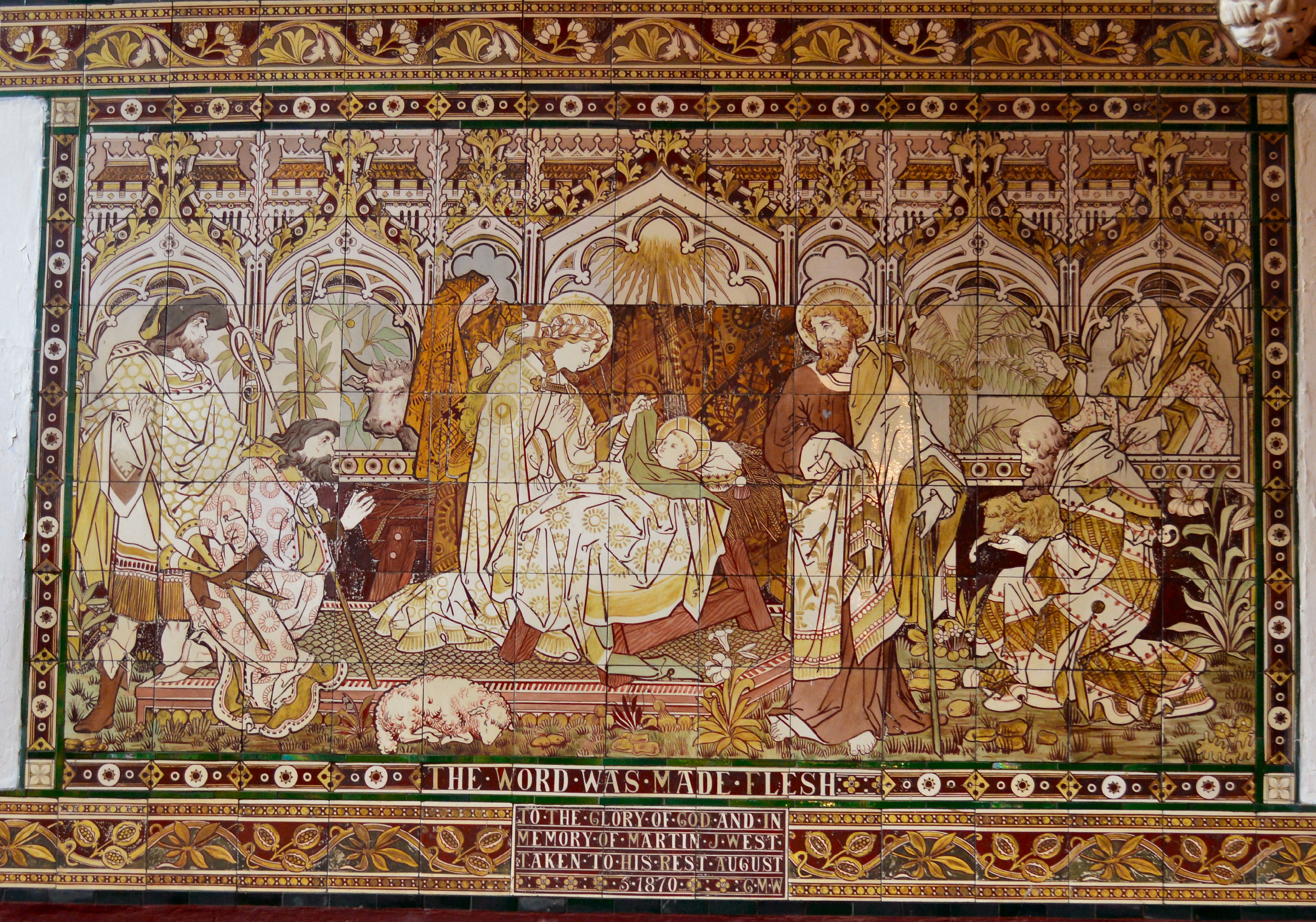
Tiled panel, St Paul's Church, Knightsbridge

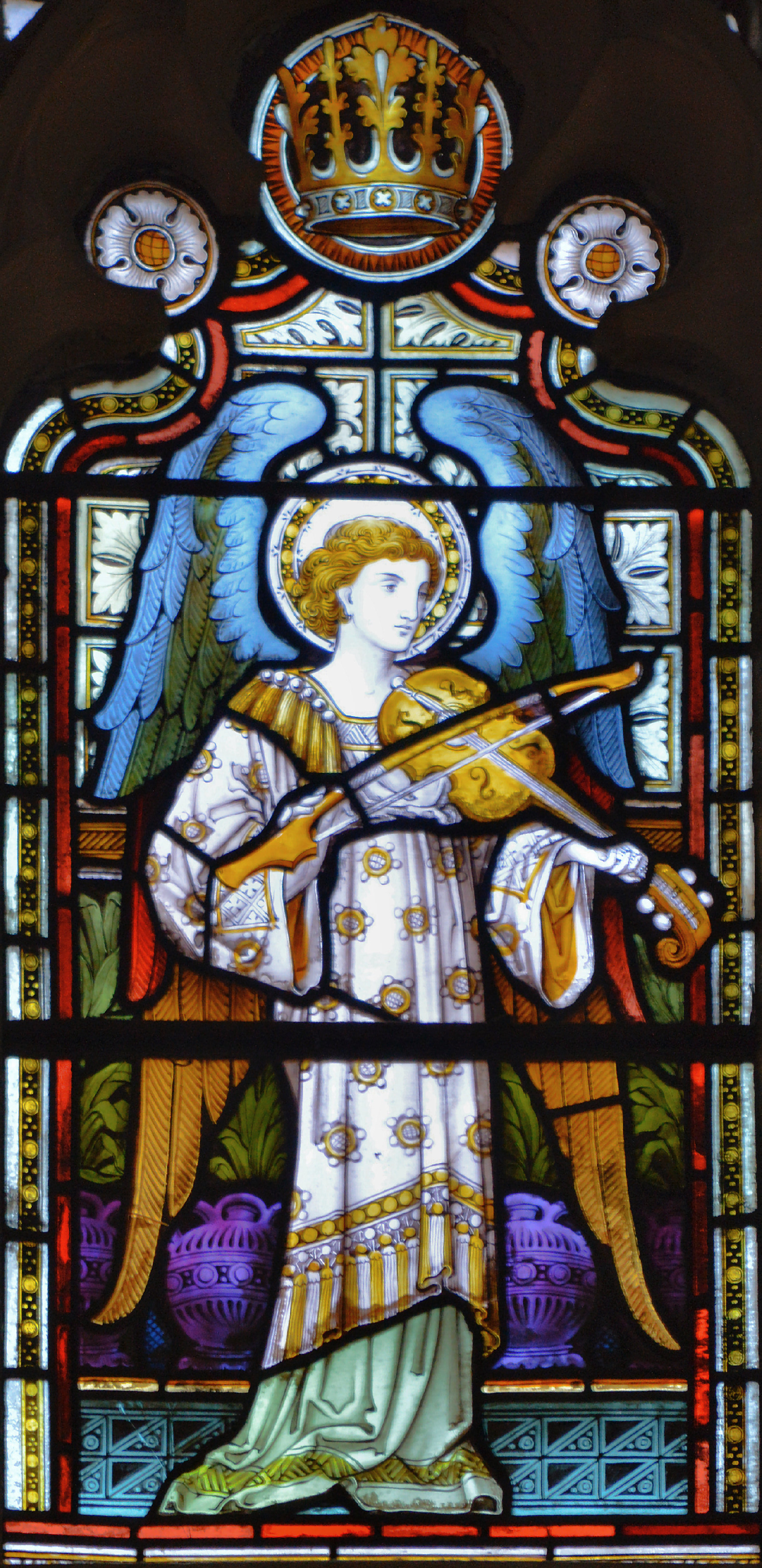
Window, St Michael and All Angels, Bedford Park

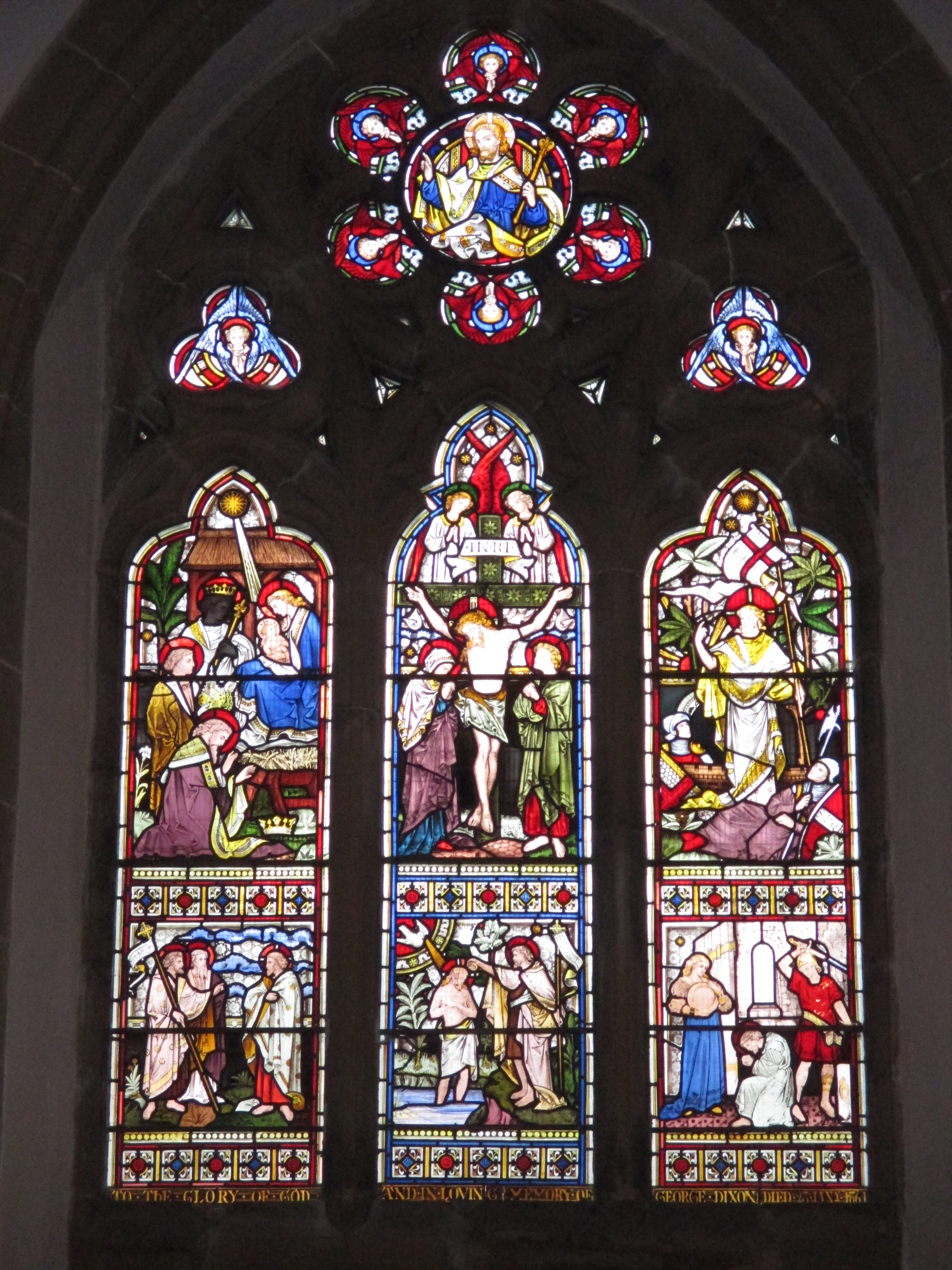
Window, Wivelsfield Church

== Works (incomplete) ==
St Mary Magdalene, Paddington. Nave ceiling.

St Michael and All Angels, Bedford Park. 1880. East window (destroyed) and clerestory windows.

St Paul's Church, Knightsbridge. 1870s. Tiled panels in the nave with scenes from the life of Jesus.

Grove Gardens Chapel, Richmond, London. 1877. Mosaic reredos and stained glass windows.

=== Bell, Redfern and Almond ===
St Stephen's Church, Camden Town. 1866.

St Mary Magdalene's, Munster Square. 1867. Frescoes

=== Bell and Almond ===
All Saints Church, Bradley, Hampshire. 1869. Three light window showing the crucifixion.

All Saints Church, Shouldham, Norfolk. 1870. Reredos. 1877. East window

St Peter's Church, Lampeter, Ceredigion, Wales. 1870. South aisle stained glass of St David

Holy Trinity Church, Wolverton, Buckinghamshire. 1870. Wall paintings and stained glass in nave

St John the Baptist, Bathwick, Somerset. 1871. Stained glass

St Martin's Church, Bowness-on-Windermere, Cumbria. 1871. Alabaster and mosaic reredos.

St Bartholomew's Chapel, Sandwich, Kent. 1872. Stained glass of the crucifixion.

St Mary the Virgin, Edlesborough, Buckinghamshire. 1867. Window in chancel, angel wall painting.
