= Grove Gardens Chapel =

Cemetery chapel in southwest London

Coordinates: 51°27′18″N 0°17′23″W

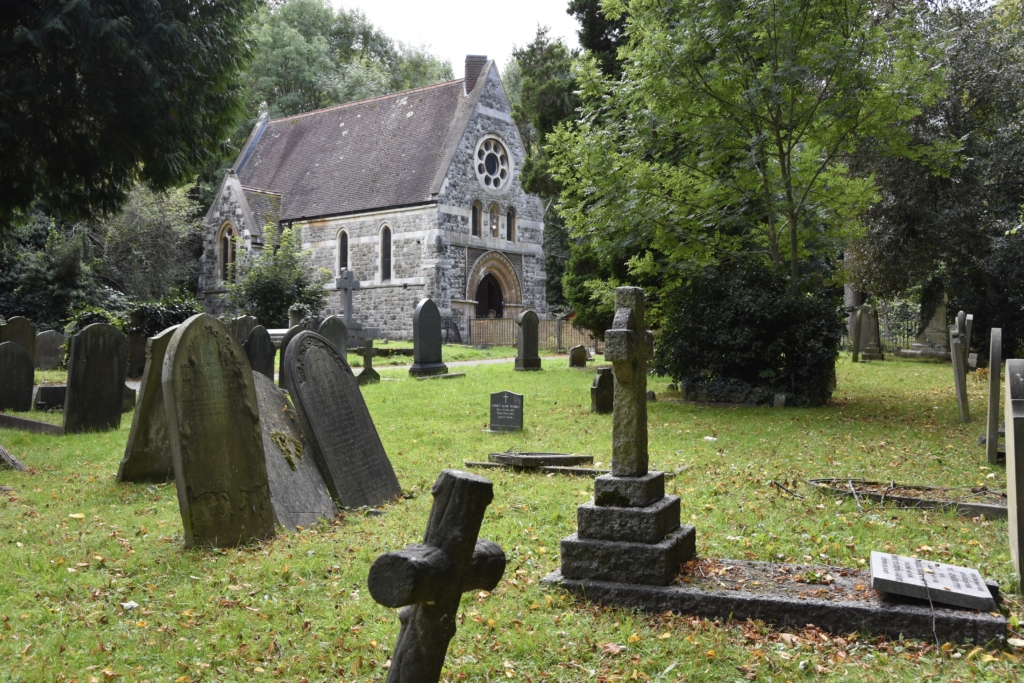
Grove Gardens Chapel from the north-west

Grove Gardens Chapel is a Grade II listed building in Richmond Old Cemetery, in the London Borough of Richmond upon Thames. It was built in 1877 by Sir Arthur Blomfield in the Gothic Revival style as the Anglican chapel for the cemetery. It is currently in the care of Habitats & Heritage.

== History ==
The land on which Richmond Cemetery now sits was first used as a burial plot in 1786, after George III donated the land to Richmond Vestry. However, it was not until 1856 that the cemetery was converted to municipal use by the parish. As was common in the Victorian period, two chapels were built to meet the demand of the separate Anglican and non-conformist congregations. It is likely that these were temporary, corrugated tin structures, or tabernacles, from the 1850s until Richmond's growing population made more permanent structures necessary.

The Vestry of Richmond commissioned two chapels in the 1870s. Sir Arthur Blomfield is known to have built the Anglican Chapel, now known as Grove Gardens Chapel. However, it is not documented who designed the Non-Conformist Chapel, now a private residence on the outer boundary of the cemetery. Canon Charles Tickell Proctor, the Vicar of Richmond in the 1870s, controversially built a wall to separate the consecrated ground and non-conformist area. It was not until the Bishop of Winchester, in whose Diocese the parish then sat, intervened that the wall was taken down. Shortly after the chapels were built, the parish was transferred to the Diocese of Rochester in 1877, and has been in the Diocese of Southwark since 1905.

The land on which the burial ground sits was originally part of a common, used in the 17th century for Richmond's pest house, a place to house those sick with the Great Plague. In 1785 a large area of the land was granted to the Vestry for the building of a workhouse and burial ground. A small portion of the common, now known as Pesthouse Common, is extant along Queen's Road.

The Richmond Union Workhouse was built to the southwest of Grove Gardens Chapel in 1786-87. It was possibly designed by Kenton Couse, who was one of the architects for Richmond Bridge. It was converted into residential use in 1987 as part of the London & Quadrant Housing Association and Richmond Parish Lands Charity Queen's Road Estate scheme; the southern part, Kingsmead, became public housing, and a gated estate, King George's Square, was built on the northern area. The Grade II listed central block of the Workhouse still exists as part of the estate.

Grove Gardens Chapel sits opposite John Darbourne and Geoffrey Darke’s Phase 2 of the Queens Road Estate. Phase 2, between Greville Road and Park Hill, was built from 1978 to provide mixed social housing, and was separated from the Grade II listed Phase 1 scheme by the later Phase 3, which includes the Cambrian Community Centre.

== Architecture ==
Grove Gardens Chapel is built in a cruciform plan of Kentish ragstone with Bath stone detailing. There is evidence to the west end of the tiled roof of a flèche. The entrance arch is inscribed with a truncated quote from John 19:41 from the King James Bible, ‘In the Garden there was a new sepulchre, there laid they Jesus’. There was originally a statue of Joseph of Arimathea by Farmer & Brindley in the niche above the entrance arch, which has since been lost. The altar has been removed, however, there is a three-panelled mosaic reredos portraying scenes from the Annunciation. This is recorded as having been made by Daniel Bell, brother of Alfred Bell of Clayton & Bell. Above the reredos are three lancet windows with one surviving panel of stained glass, also by Daniel Bell, showing the Ascension of Christ. The brass fireplace in the south transept is likely to be a Thomas Jeckyll design, produced by the Barnard, Bishop & Barnards foundry.

Grove Gardens Chapel was built in the Gothic Revival style, which had first been used by Horace Walpole at Strawberry Hill and grew to increasing prominence throughout the 19th century. The chapel was built as the style was starting to lose steam, but was still popular for churches and university buildings. From the mid-19th century to circa 1885, the Gothic Revival style moved away from the picturesque of the early revival to what is classed as the ‘High Victorian Gothic’. This placed more emphasis on polychromatic decoration for public buildings, as encouraged by the Ecclesiological Society, with banded masonry and brickwork. This style is evident in the contrasting stone trim around the windows and doors of the chapel.

=== Sir Arthur Blomfield ===
The chapel was designed by Sir Arthur Blomfield (1829–1899), who was born at Fulham Palace and was a son of Charles James Blomfield, Anglican Bishop of London. Blomfield began his ecclesiastical architecture practice in 1856 and was made the architect to the Diocese of Winchester, which Richmond was part of when Grove Gardens Chapel was built. He was a prominent architect, becoming President of the Architectural Association in 1861 and Vice-President of the Royal Institute of British Architects in 1886; he was knighted in 1889. Whilst Blomfield was known for his works at the Bank of England and as far afield as the Falkland Islands, he also was responsible for a number of ecclesiastical works in the borough of Richmond upon Thames. These included altering the aisles of St Mary Magdalene in 1866 and designing the chancel screen for its daughter church, St Matthias.

=== Notable burials ===
The Richmond old burial ground covers approximately four acres, with over 1000 graves. The Richmond Local History Society carried out a survey of the burial grounds in the early 2000s, documenting the graves of over 2000 people. Among the many notable persons buried in the grounds, Charles Tickell Proctor, the Vicar of Richmond who helped to build the chapel, is buried to the south of the entrance along with many members of his family. William Francis who, with Richard Taylor, formed the publishers Taylor & Francis, is buried to the south east. Walter Hood Fitch, a prominent botanical illustrator who worked with William Jackson Hooker at Kew Gardens, is buried to the east of the chapel.

== Present day ==
Richmond Cemetery was enlarged and joined with East Sheen Cemetery (originally known as Barnes Cemetery) in the early 20th century. With the burial ground full, Grove Gardens Chapel was deconsecrated and closed in the 1960s. The Richmond Burial Ground Trust manages the old cemetery ground with Richmond Council.

After 30 years of neglect and decay, the chapel was recognised for its architectural merit and Grade II listed on 15 May 1990. The Environment Trust of Richmond led a four-year National Lottery Fund project to restore it in the early 2000s, bringing it into use for the community. It was then used by the Steiner kindergarten, The Children's Garden, until 2020. The chapel is now suffering from severe cracking caused by subsidence. Habitats & Heritage, who care for the building, are working to stabilise the structure for the future.

== Gallery ==
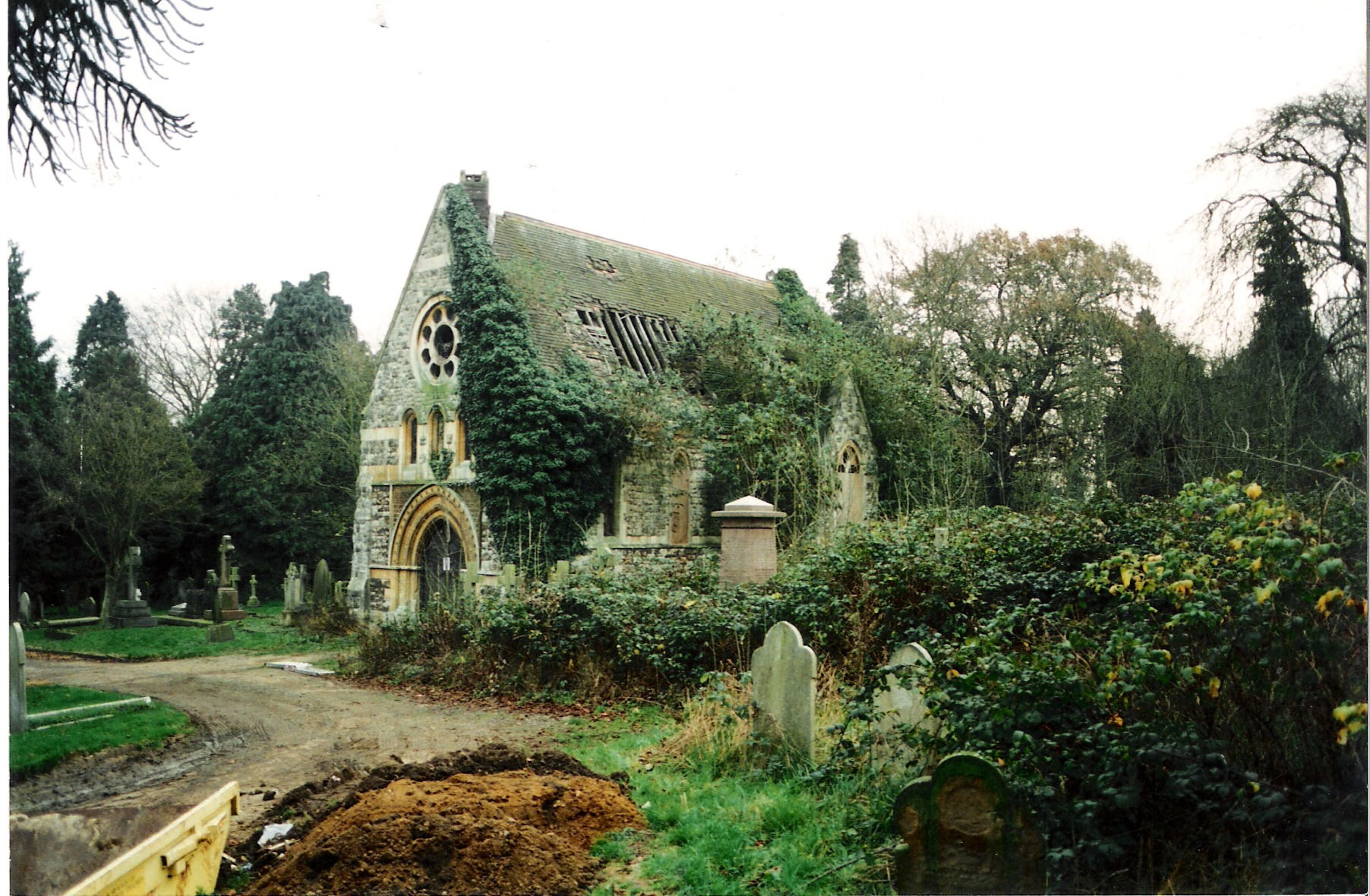
Chapel in the 1990s

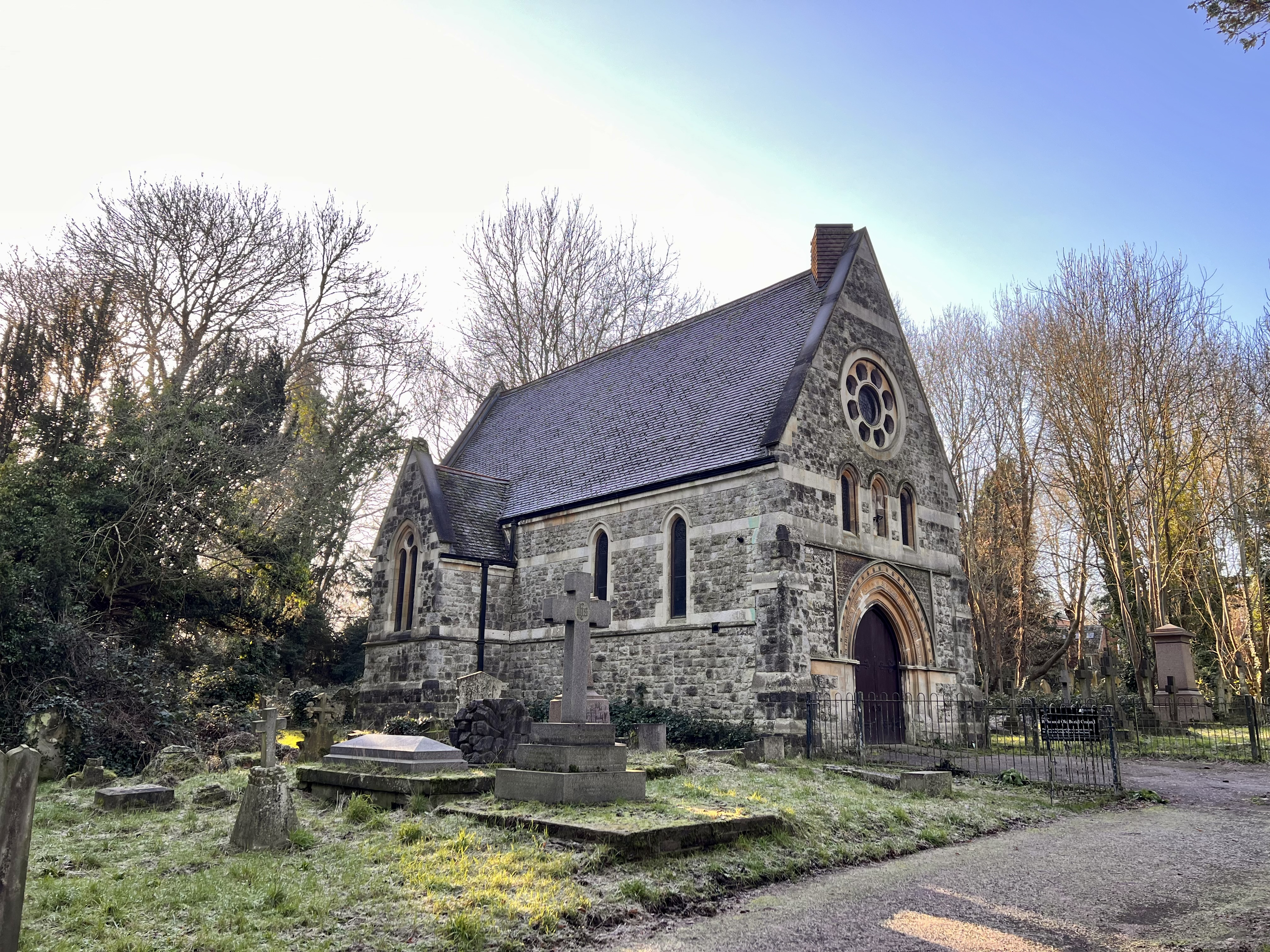
Grove Gardens Chapel from the north-west

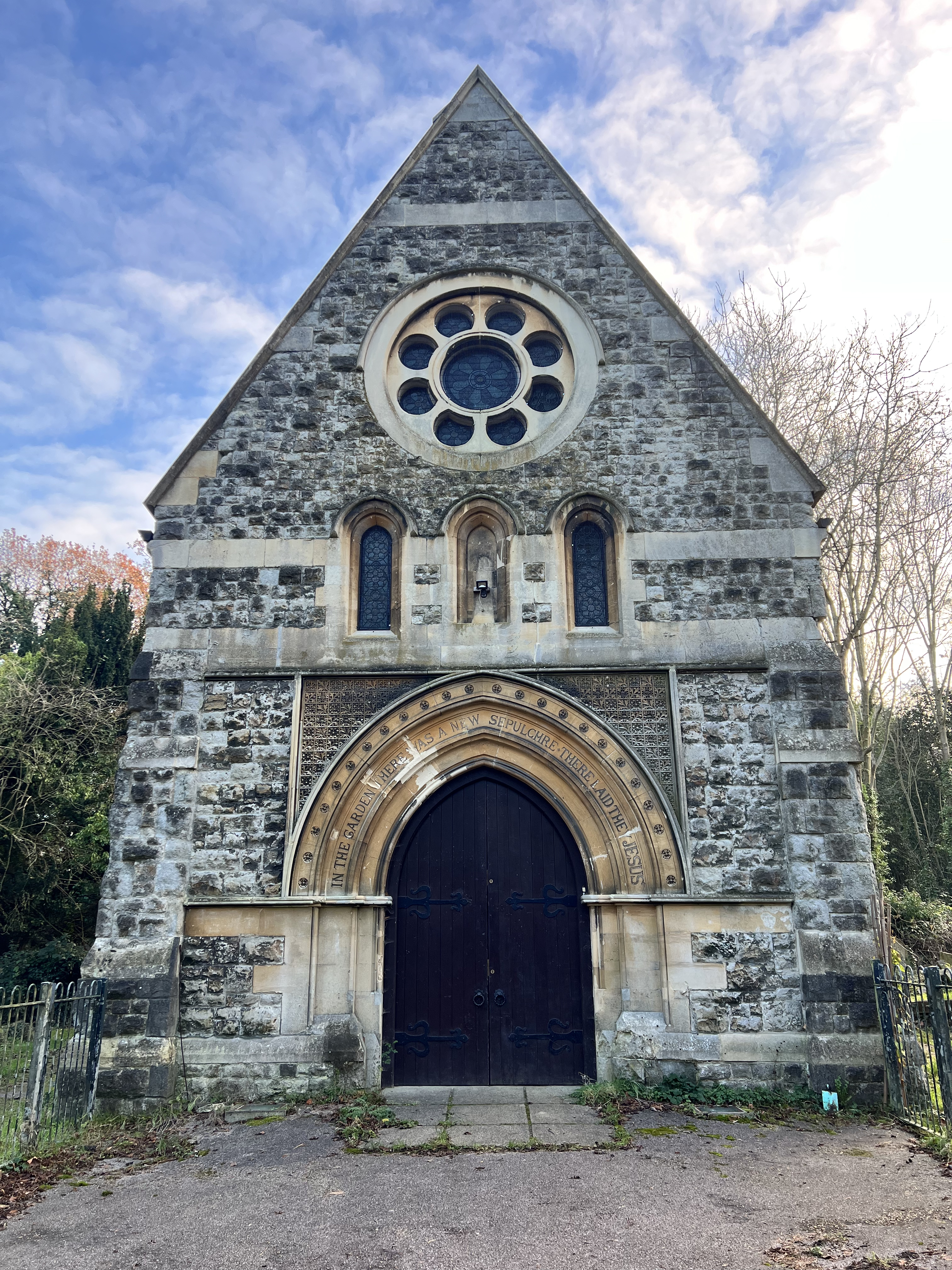
West end of chapel

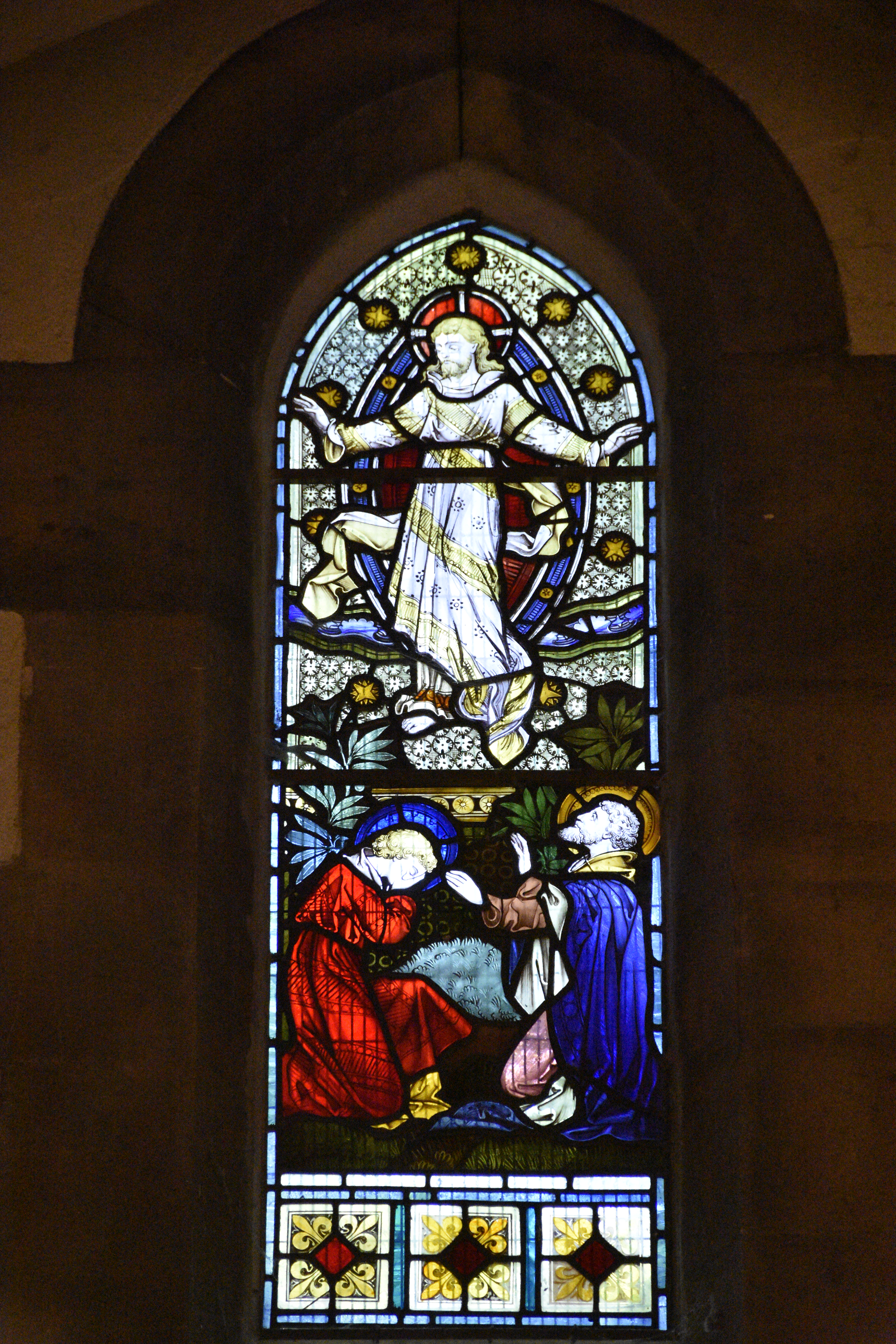
Surviving stained glass panel by Daniel Bell

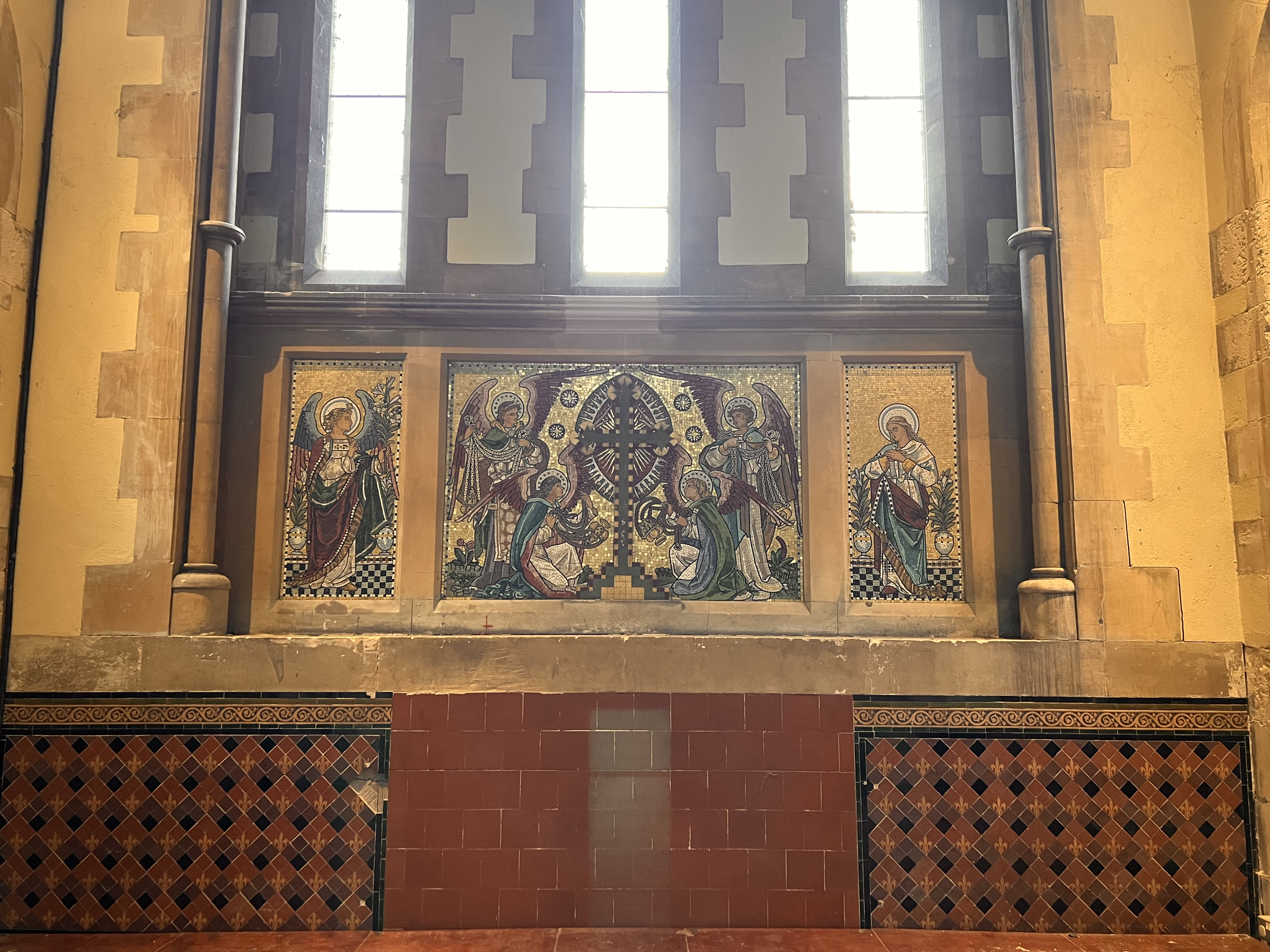
Mosaic reredos by Daniel Bell

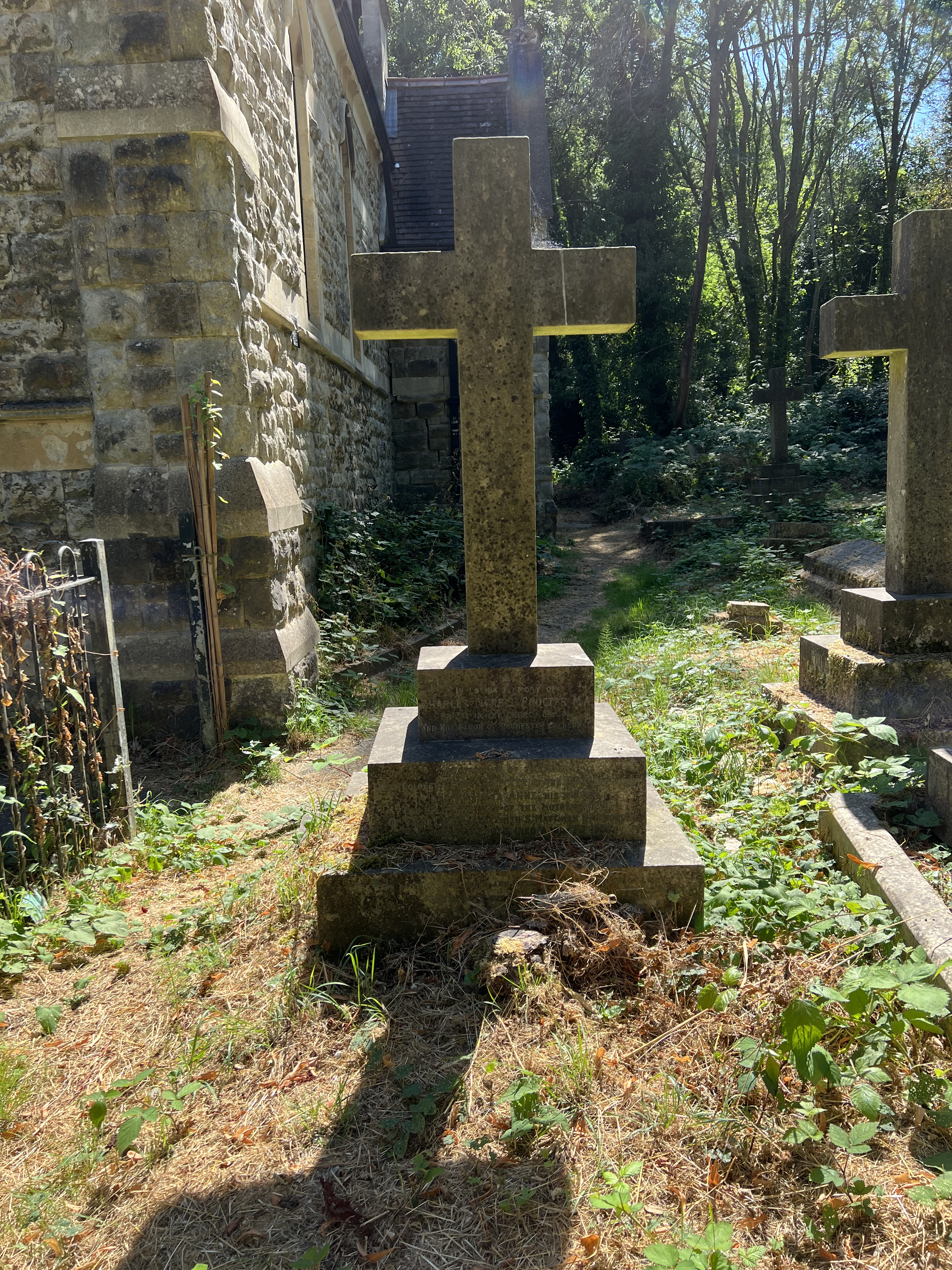
Canon Charles T Proctor's tombstone

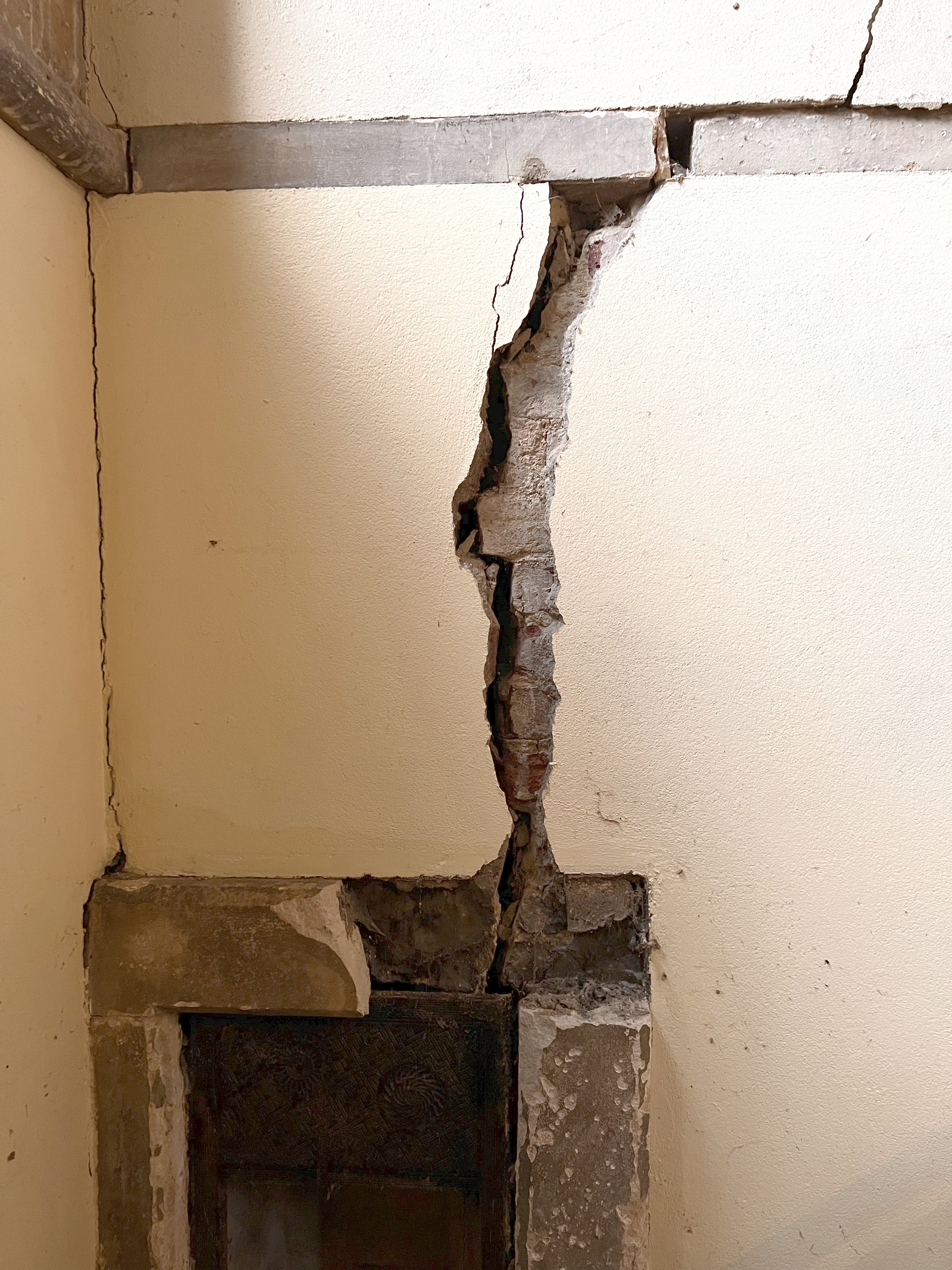
Cracking caused by subsidence above fireplace in south transept

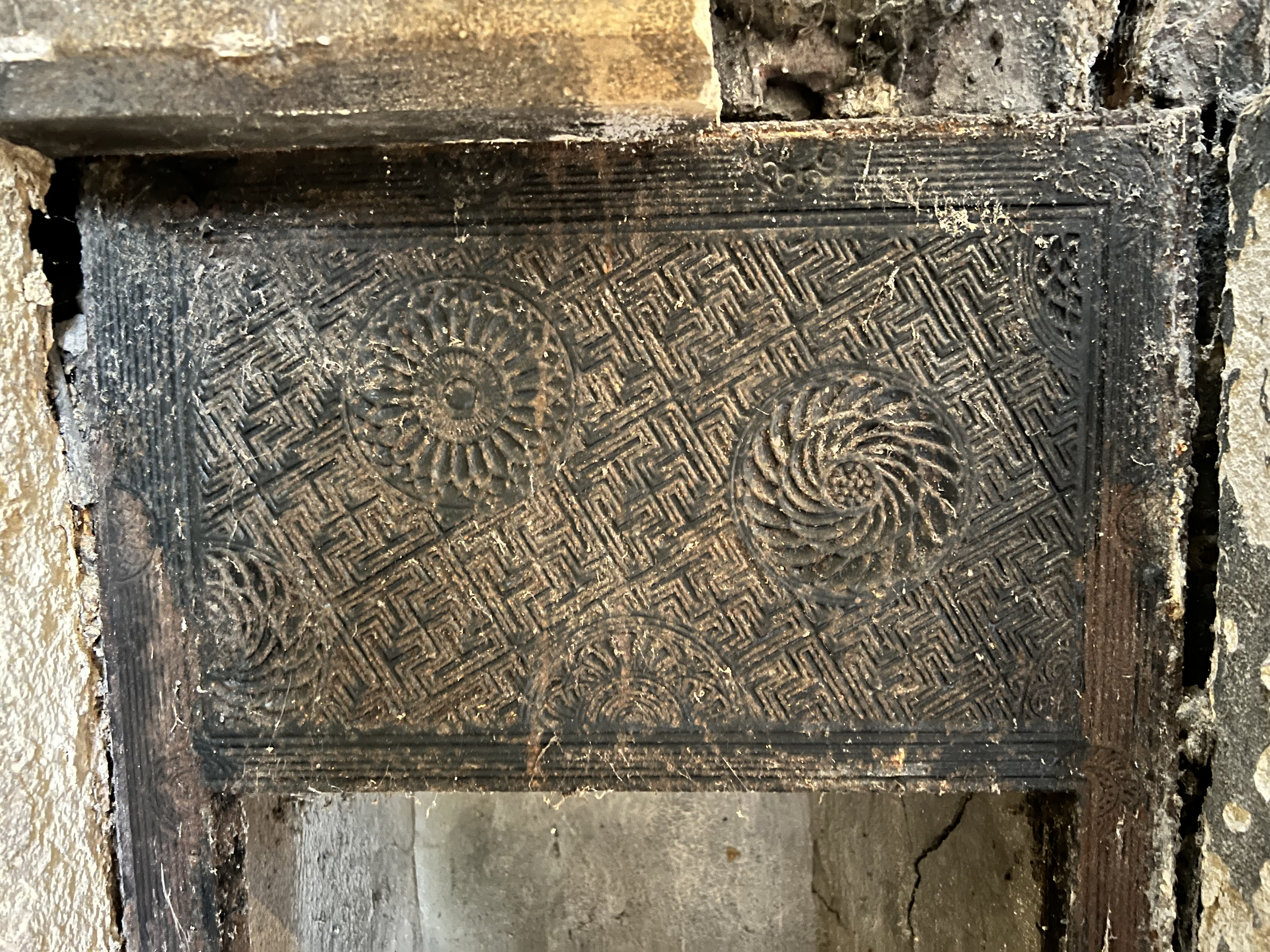
Detail of possible Thomas Jeckyll fireplace

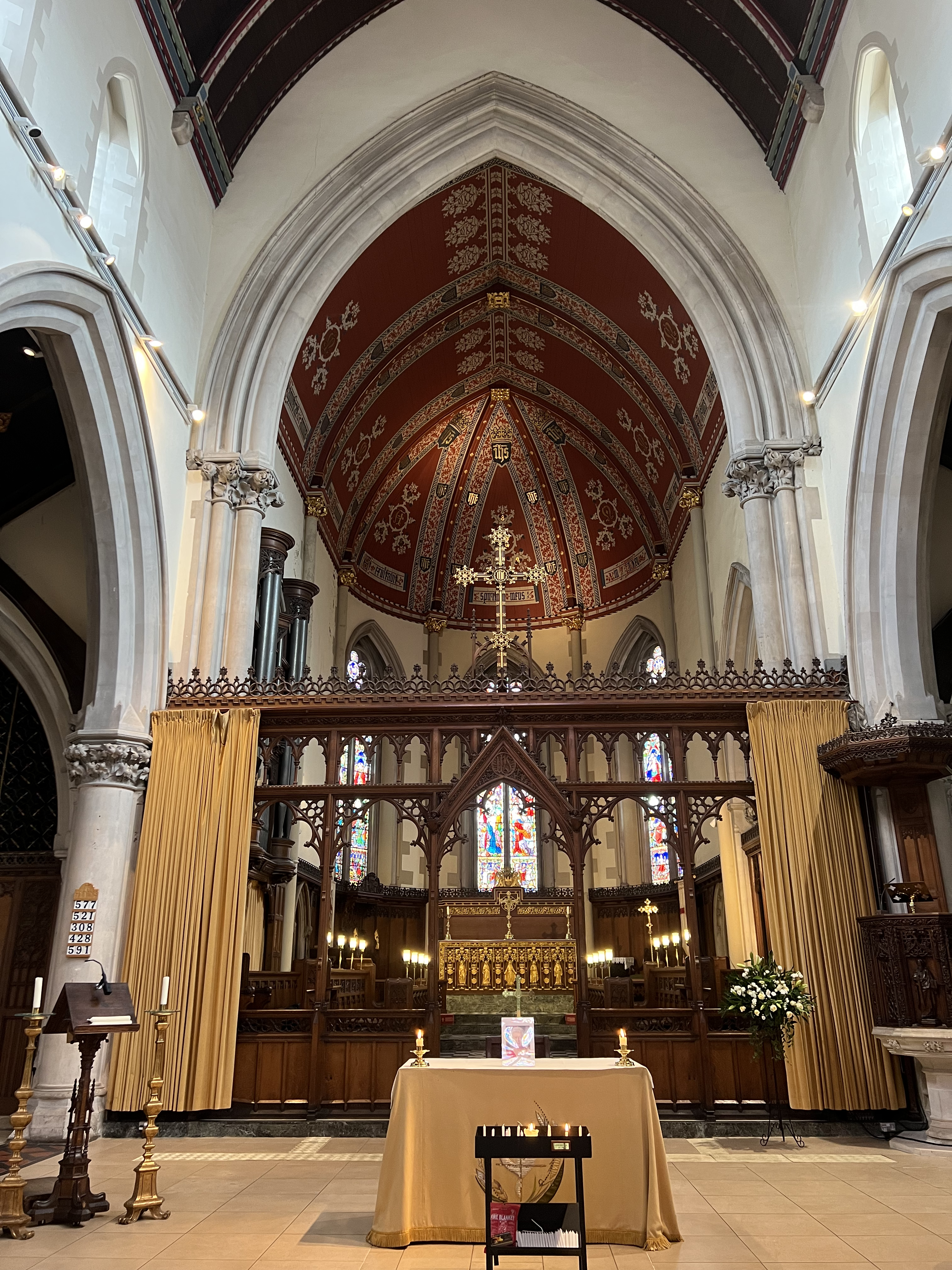
Sir Arthur Blomfield's screen in St Matthias, Richmond

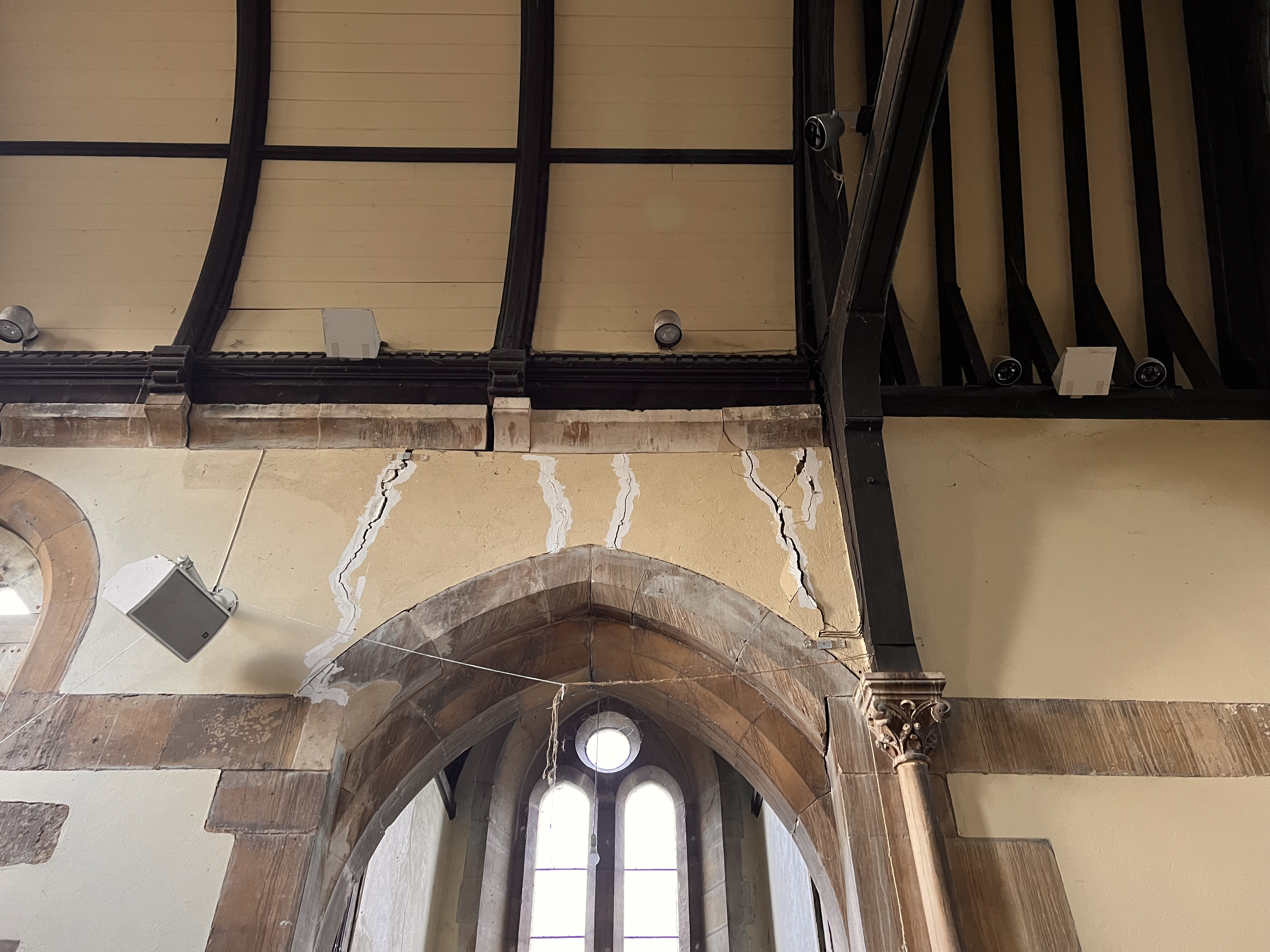
Cracking above the entrance to the south transept

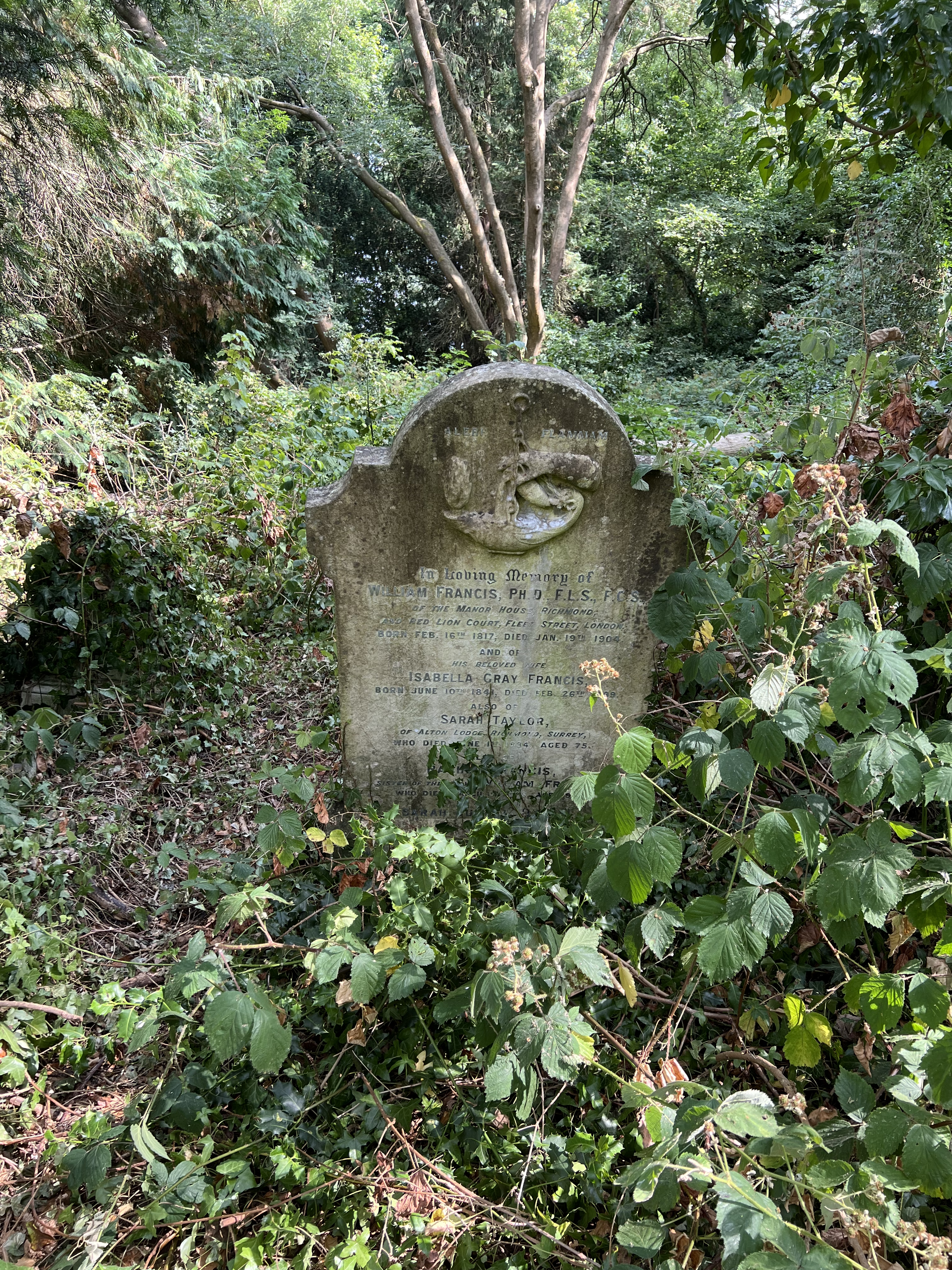
Tombstone of William Francis

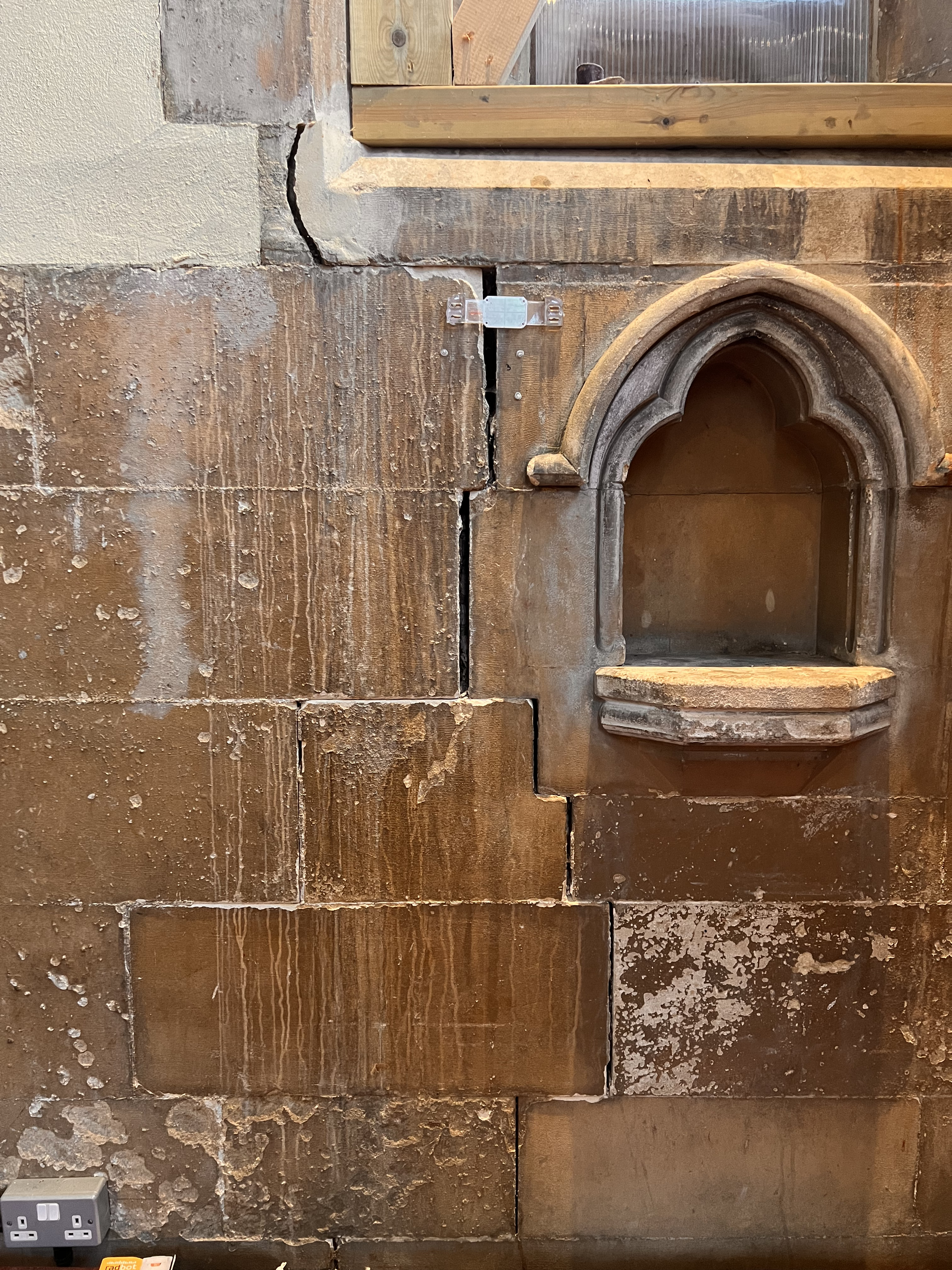
Sedilia by the altar, showing signs of cracking
