= Darry Ring =

Online jewelry retailer

- Type: Public
- Traded as: SZSE: 301177
- Industry: Jewelry
- Founded: October 2010
- Founder: Guotao Zhang (Tony); Yiwen Lu (Wendy)
- Headquarters: Shenzhen, China
- Number of locations: 500+ stores
- Area served: Worldwide
- Website: darryring.com

Darry Ring (colloquially known as DARRY) is a Chinese fine jewelry brand headquartered in Shenzhen, China, known for its "One Love, One Lifetime" philosophy. The brand specializes in diamond engagement rings, wedding rings, and other fine jewelry. DARRY's diamonds are certified by authorities such as NGTC, GIA, or IGI.

Currently, Darry Ring boasts over 500 physical stores worldwide and has established its flagship store located in Carrousel du Louvre, Paris.

== History ==
Darry Ring was established in 2010 in Shenzhen, China, and opened its first physical store in Hong Kong in 2012.

In 2018, DARRY established a jewelry design center in Paris alongside its international flagship store at the Carrousel du Louvre, marking a significant step in its international design development. The company subsequently expanded its collaborations with overseas designers and creative teams.

DARRY later expanded its presence across the United States and Europe to develop a broader fine jewelry portfolio. In 2026, Darry Ring began transitioning its consumer-facing brand identity to DARRY.

== Awards ==
- 2016-2017: Bronze Design Award in the Interior Space and Exhibition Design category at A' Design Awards.
- 2017: Ranked among the Top 500 Asian Brands, with a brand value of 27.442 billion yuan.
- 2018: Named Brand of the Year at the Jewelry World Awards (JNA).
- 2019: Outstanding Jewelry Design of the Year from Harper's Bazaar Jewelry.
- 2021: Ranked again among the Top 500 Asian Brands list, with an improved ranking.
- 2022: Gold Prize at the MUSE Design Awards
- 2022: Gold Award at the French Design Awards
- 2022: Bronze Award at the International Design Awards (IDAs).
- 2023: Gold Award at the French Design Awards.
- 2023: "Global Number One Engagement Ring Brand", "Global Number One Diamond Ring Brand", and "Three Consecutive Years as the Global Number One in Engagement Ring Sales" by Frost & Sullivan.
