= Grand Louvre =

Project initiated by François Mitterrand in 1981

The Louvre Pyramid, symbol of the Grand Louvre, with the Louvre's Denon Pavilion in the background

The Grand Louvre was a decade-long project initiated by French President François Mitterrand in 1981 which expanded and remodelled the Louvre – both the building and the museum – by moving the French Finance Ministry, which had been located in the Louvre's northern wing since 1871, to a different location. The centerpiece of the Grand Louvre is the Louvre Pyramid designed by Chinese-American architect I. M. Pei, which was also the project's most controversial component. The Grand Louvre was substantially completed in the late 1990s, even though its last elements were only finalized in the 2010s.

== Background ==
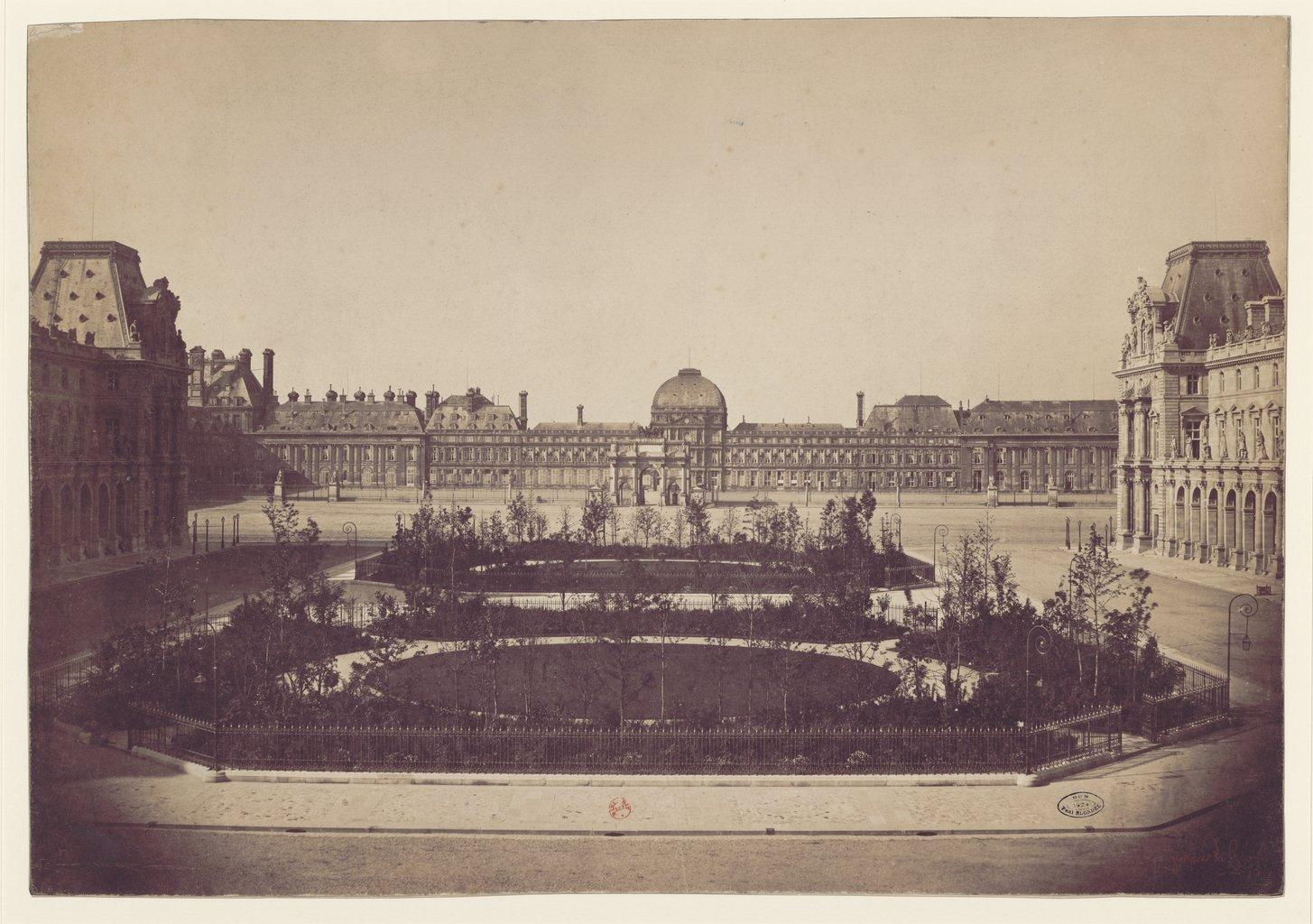
The gardens of what is now the Cour Napoléon with the Tuileries Palace in the background, photographed in 1859

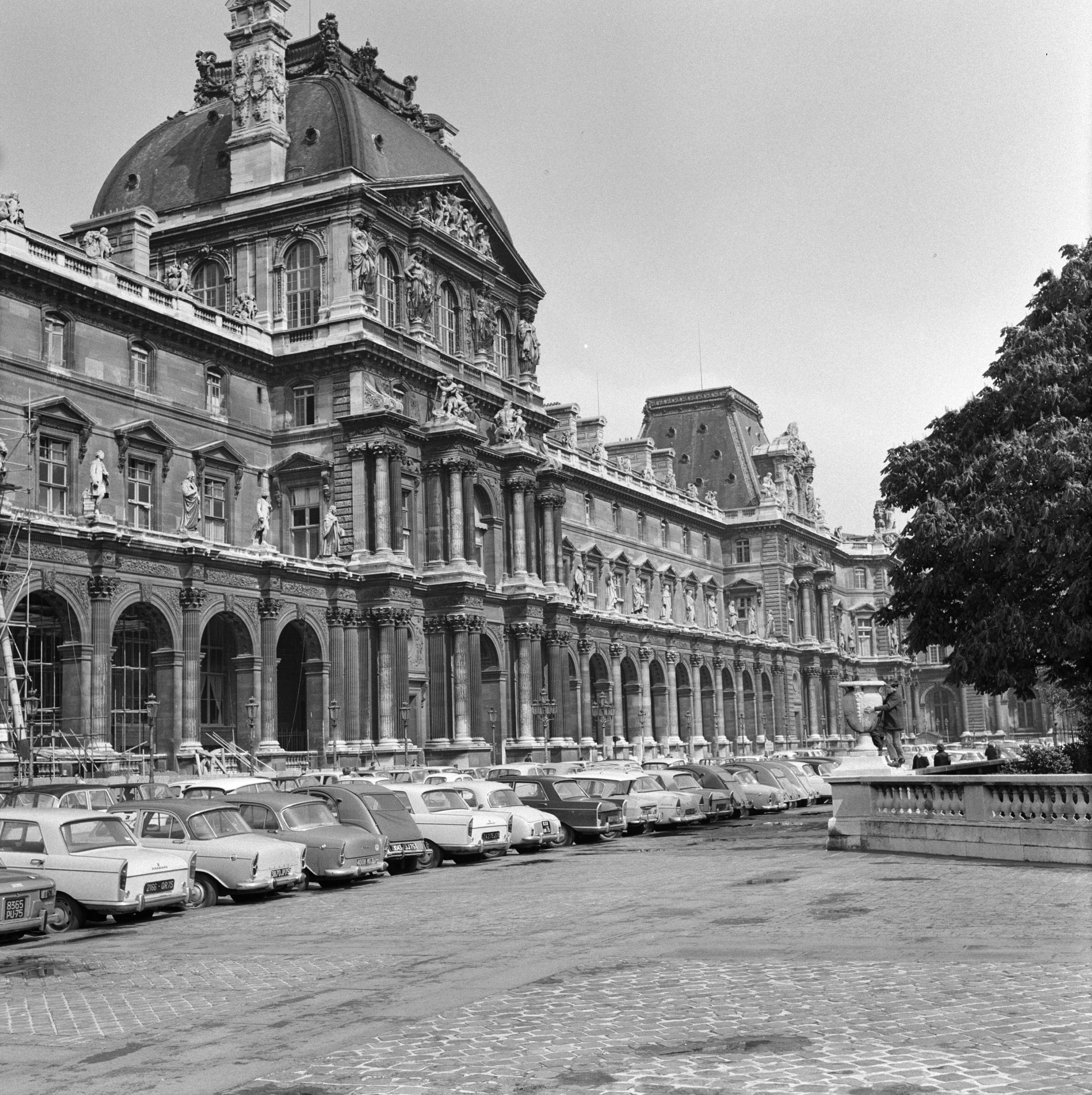
Finance Ministry employees' cars parked in the Cour Napoléon, 1965

Following Louis XIV's move to Versailles in the 1660s, the Louvre Palace ceased to be mainly used as a royal palace and became inhabited by artists, civil servants and the occasional royal, as well as hosting various bodies and institutions. Even after the Louvre Museum was first established in 1793, many other activities still existed in the palace. This mixed-use reality was perpetuated in Napoleon III's Louvre expansion, which resulted in the entrenchment of administrative offices in the Louvre's North Wing, from 1871 mainly the Ministry of Finance.

The expansion of the museum's collections, combined with the gradual shift of curatorial practices towards less cluttered displays, meant that the Louvre Museum was increasingly short of space, despite the periodical release of some of its holdings to other museums in Paris. Thus, the pre-Columbian artifacts of the musée américain left in 1887 to the newly created Musée d'Ethnographie du Trocadéro; in 1905 the ethnographic collections of the Musée de Marine were divided between the Trocadéro museum, the National Antiquities Museum and the Chinese Museum (Fontainebleau); the rest of the Musée de Marine followed in the early 1940s, to the Palais de Chaillot; the Louvre's extensive Asian art collections were handed over to the Guimet Museum in 1945; and most of its French artworks created after 1848 (except those which had to remain in the Louvre because of binding bequest provisions) were headed for the Musée d'Orsay by the early 1980s.

Even so, the Louvre Museum was cramped and lacked any space for modern facilities such as reserves, educational spaces, shops, restaurants and cafés, not to mention security screening, cloakrooms or washrooms. Its exterior spaces had also deteriorated from their heyday during the Second French Empire, and had never been remodeled after the destruction of the Tuileries Palace in the 1870s had fundamentally altered the logic of their arrangement. In the central courtyard, the two octagonal gardens were poorly maintained and surrounded by the parking lots for Finance Ministry employees (to the north) and museum staff (to the south). Because of lack of parking space in the vicinity, unsightly tourist buses were permanently stationed along the southern side of the palace.

The natural solution was to relocate the ministry to another site and to repurpose the North Wing for an expanded museum with improved and larger support facilities. This option was advocated in 1950 by Georges Salles, then the head of the French Museum Administration, and subsequently by other experts and curators. But it ran against the considerable power of the Finance Ministry, whose senior bureaucrats had no appetite for abandoning their offices' convenient and highly prestigious Louvre location.

== Announcement and controversy ==
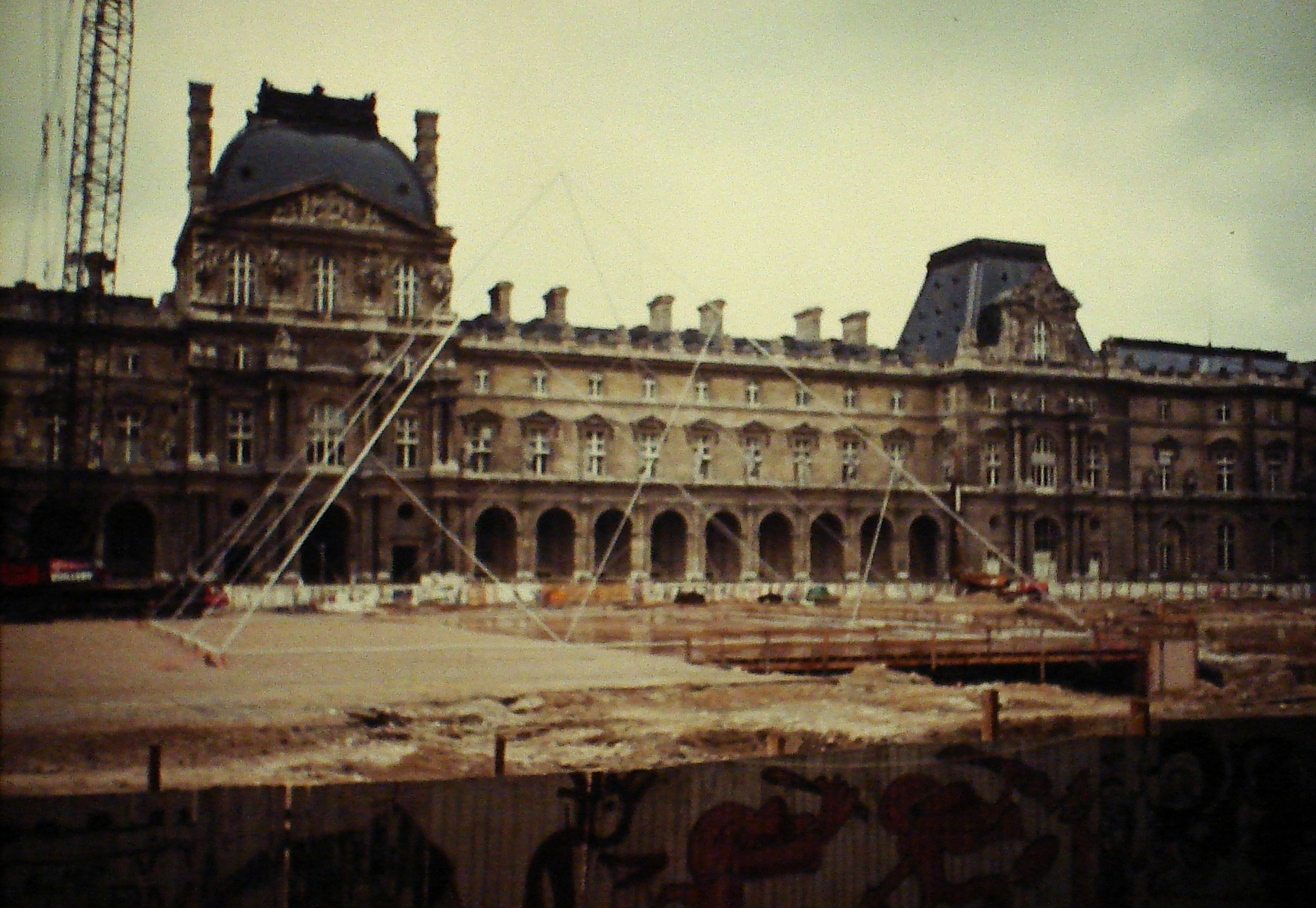
A full-scale mock-up of the pyramid was erected in 1985 with the intent to persuade the project's critics that it would fit in its surroundings

François Mitterrand unexpectedly announced his decision to remove the Finance Ministry from the Louvre and dedicate the entire building to museum use at the end of his first presidential press conference on 24 September 1981. It is probable that the influence of art historian Anne Pingeot, a curator at the Louvre since 1972 and Mitterrand's longstanding, though secret, mistress, played a significant role in the decision, which was also recommended after Mitterrand's election by his high-profile Culture Minister Jack Lang. The project, immediately dubbed Grand Louvre, became the most high-profile of Mitterrand's Grands Projets which also included the Arab World Institute, the Grande Arche, the Opéra Bastille, and later the new site of the Bibliothèque nationale de France and the Jean-Marie Tjibaou Cultural Centre, as well as the new building for the relocated Finance Ministry in the Paris neighborhood of Bercy.

The project immediately encountered criticism, including on ground of cost, not least from the finance ministry and the powers-that-be it was able to influence, which for that matter included Mitterrand's Prime Minister Pierre Mauroy. Meanwhile, on 27 July 1983 Mitterrand announced his decision to entrust the project design to Chinese-American architect I. M. Pei, who had acquired fame from successful museum designs such as those for the Museum of Fine Arts in Boston and the National Gallery of Art's East Building in Washington DC. Pei's proposed concept of a glass pyramid leading to underground spaces at the center of the Louvre, first designed in late 1983 and presented to the public in early 1984, added to the controversy: ostensibly on esthetic and preservationist grounds, but more substantially as a political proxy for attacks on Mitterrand and his "monarchical" leadership style. The campaign against the pyramid peaked in 1985, with the creation by former Culture Minister Michel Guy of an association dedicated to that fight (association pour le renouveau du Louvre) and the publication of the polemic Paris mystifié: La grande illusion du Grand Louvre by respected scholars Bruno Foucart, Sébastien Loste et Antoine Schnapper, with a preface by celebrated photographer Henri Cartier-Bresson.

Mitterrand invested significant political capital into the project, however, and was able to bring it to full completion. To create a sense of irreversibility, finance minister Pierre Bérégovoy moved his office to a temporary location outside of the Louvre in January 1986. Following the trouncing of Mitterrand's Socialist Party at the 1986 legislative election, the new finance minister Édouard Balladur announced the reversal of the decision to leave the Louvre and took up his office there in mid-April. But Balladur did not prevail, as other key members of the government, despite being political opponents of Mitterrand, acknowledged the popularity and relevance of the grand Louvre project, which was actively defended by culture minister François Léotard. A compromise was eventually announced on 29 July 1987, with a ten-year schedule for the project completion. The move of the ministry was again accelerated following Mitterrand's re-election in 1988. On 11 July 1989, Bérégovoy, again finance minister, symbolically returned to Mitterrand the keys of the finance ministry's offices in the Louvre, and the demolition and building works swiftly started in the vacated wing.

== First Phase: Pyramid and underground spaces ==
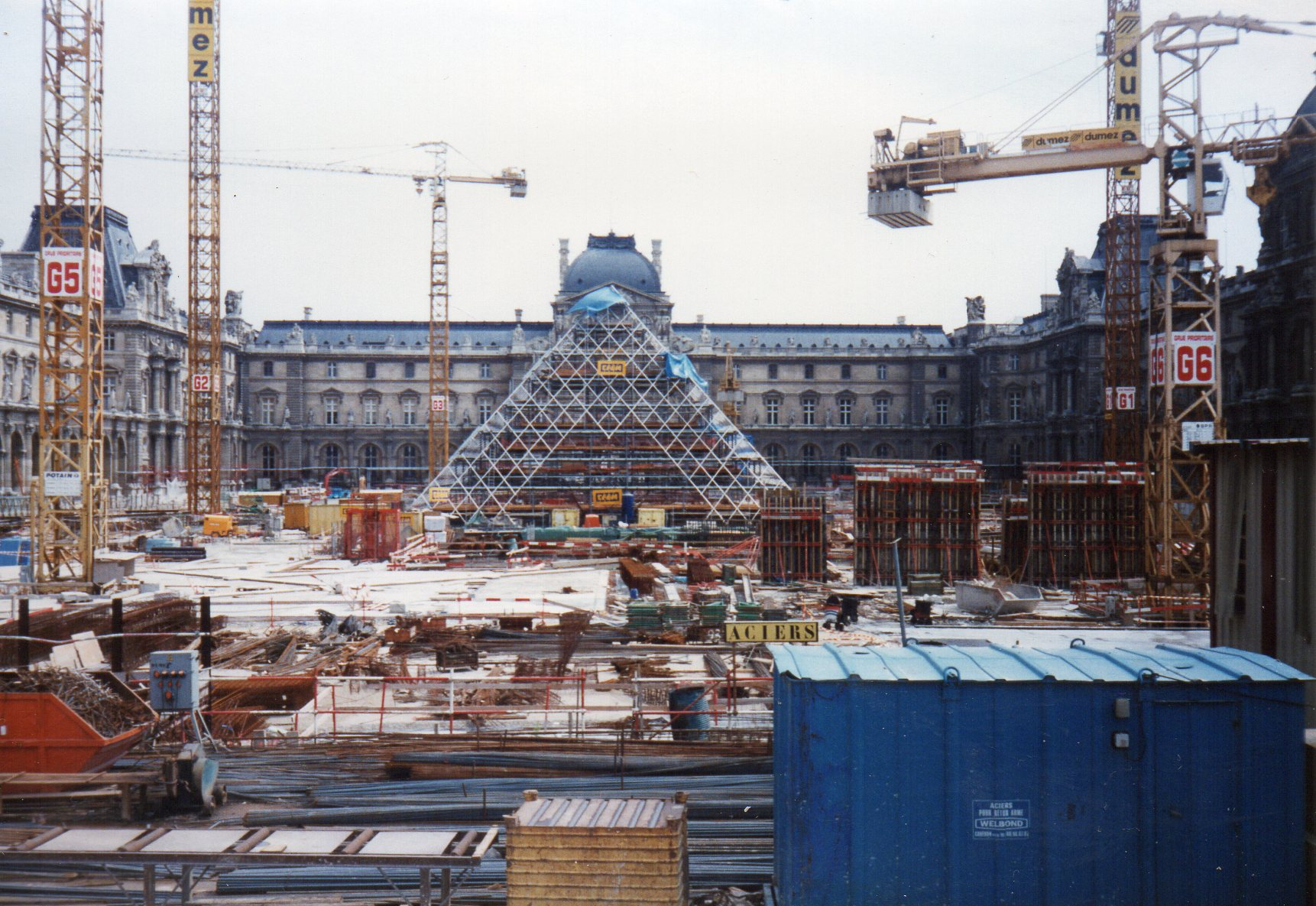
The pyramid under construction, August 1987

Work on the first phase of the project started with extensive archaeological excavations, which complemented earlier campaigns that had uncovered parts of the Medieval Louvre in 1866 and 1882 and revealed unfinished 17th-century works in front of the Colonnade in 1964. The excavations were led by Michel Fleury and Venceslas Kruta in the Cour Carrée (1983–1985), by Pierre-Jean Trombetta and Yves de Kisch in the Cour Napoléon (1984–1986), and by Paul Van Ossel in the southwestern section of the Carrousel Garden (1985–1987). A later campaign in the central and northern sections of the Carrousel Garden took place in 1989–1990. In parallel to the excavations in the Cour Carrée, the façades around the square were renovated and the new space was inaugurated on 26 June 1986.

Following the completion of the pyramid and its three accompanying pyramidions ("pyramidlets") in late 1987, the open space surrounding it, rebranded Cour Napoléon, was opened to the public on 14 October 1988, including the copy in lead of Gian Lorenzo Bernini's equestrian statue of Louis XIV placed at the exact end of Paris's axe historique. The pyramid itself, together with the vast lobby beneath it ("Hall Napoléon") and the extensive surrounding underground complex, was opened on 29 March 1989. This included the renovated remains of the medieval Louvre, namely the external moat, the internal ditch surrounding the circular keep, and a partly preserved gothic room dubbed the salle Saint-Louis.

Meanwhile, all new initiatives to renovate the Louvre's exhibition rooms were brought under the Grand Louvre project management. New galleries of 18th- and early 19th-century French paintings on the 2nd floor of the Cour Carrée, designed by Italo Rota, opened on 18 December 1992.

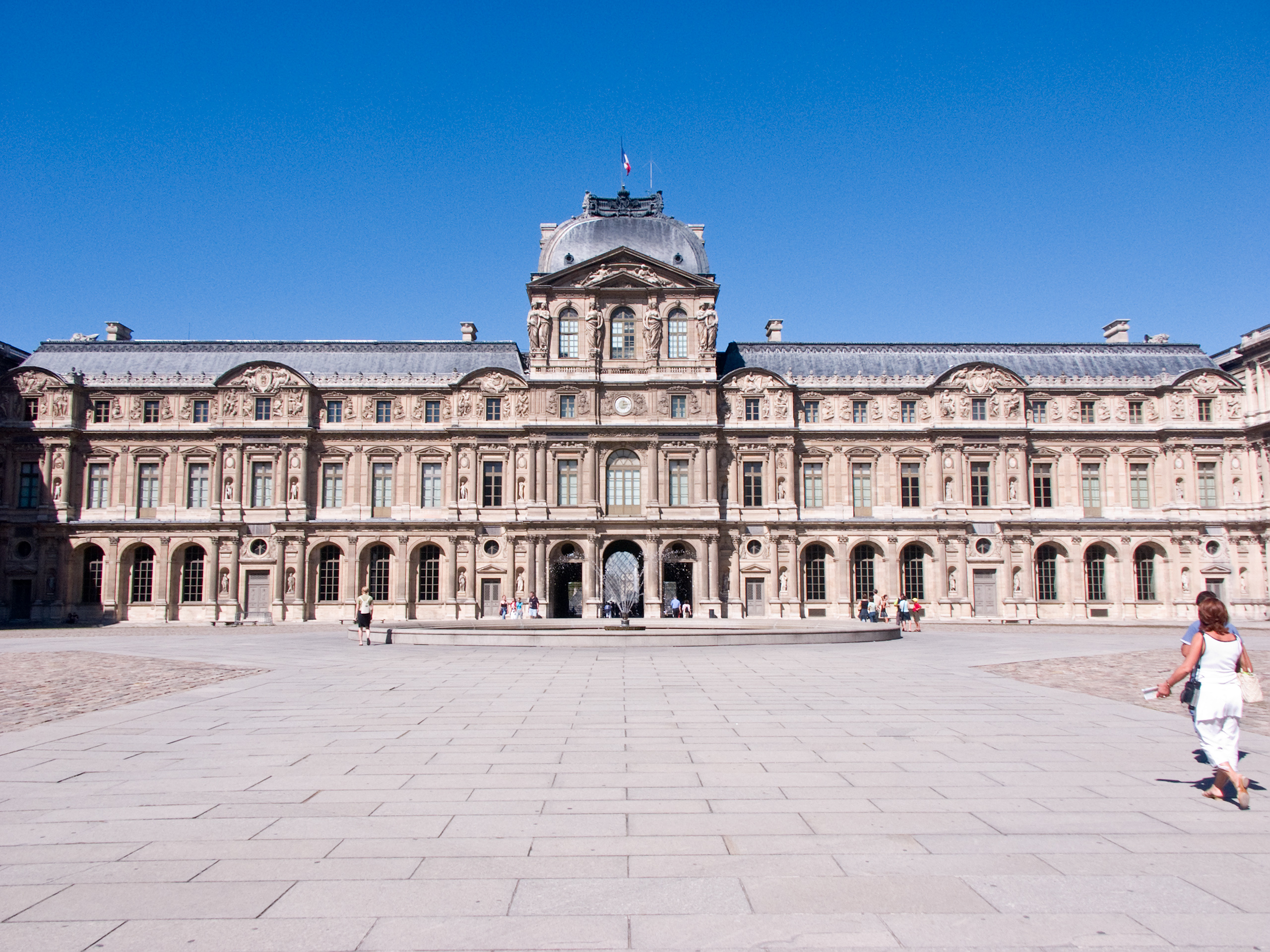
The Cour Carrée after its mid-1980s renovation

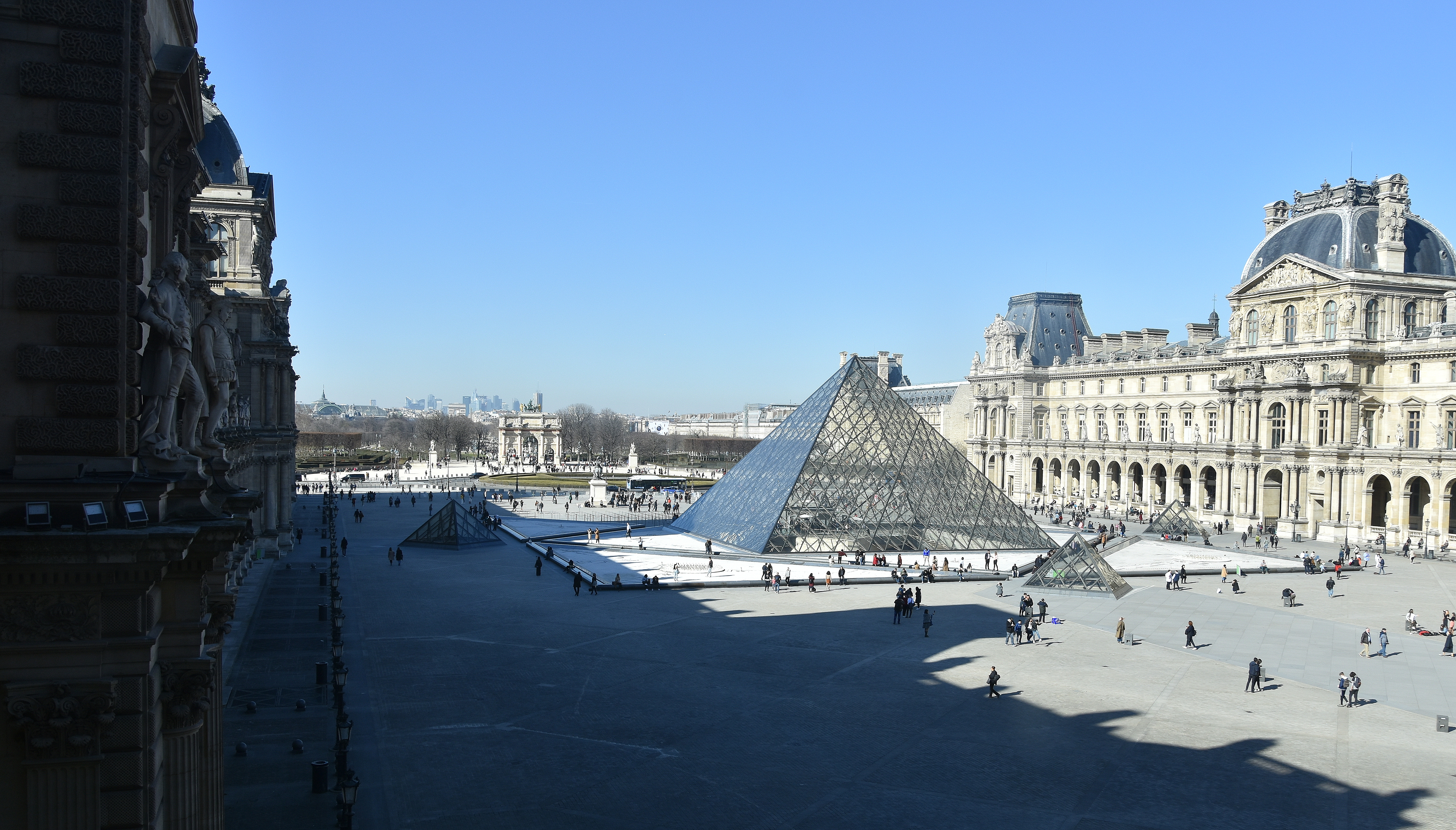
The pyramid and its three surrounding "pyramidions"

Pyramid and pyramidions at dusk

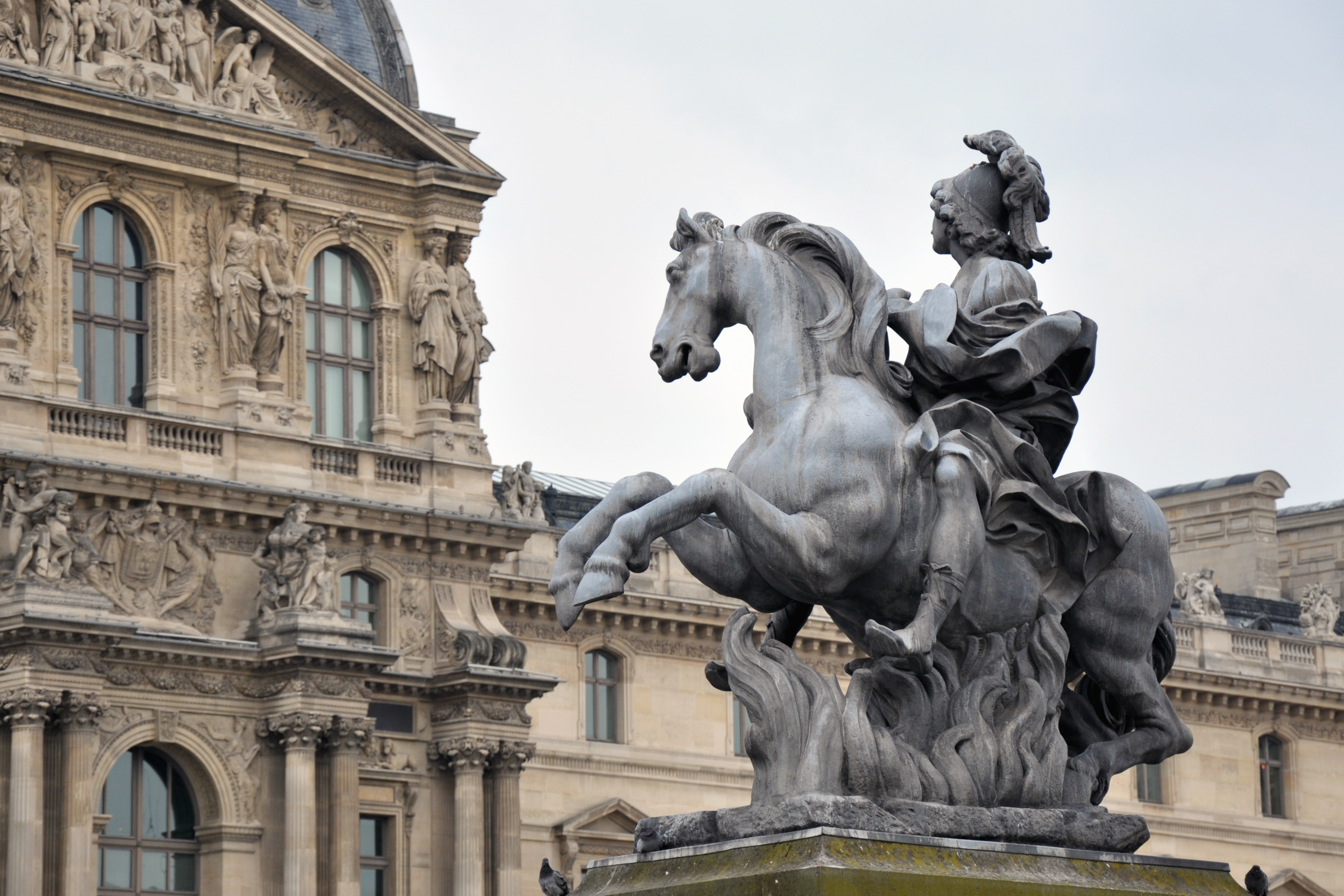
The statue of Louis XIV, copy of marble original by Bernini

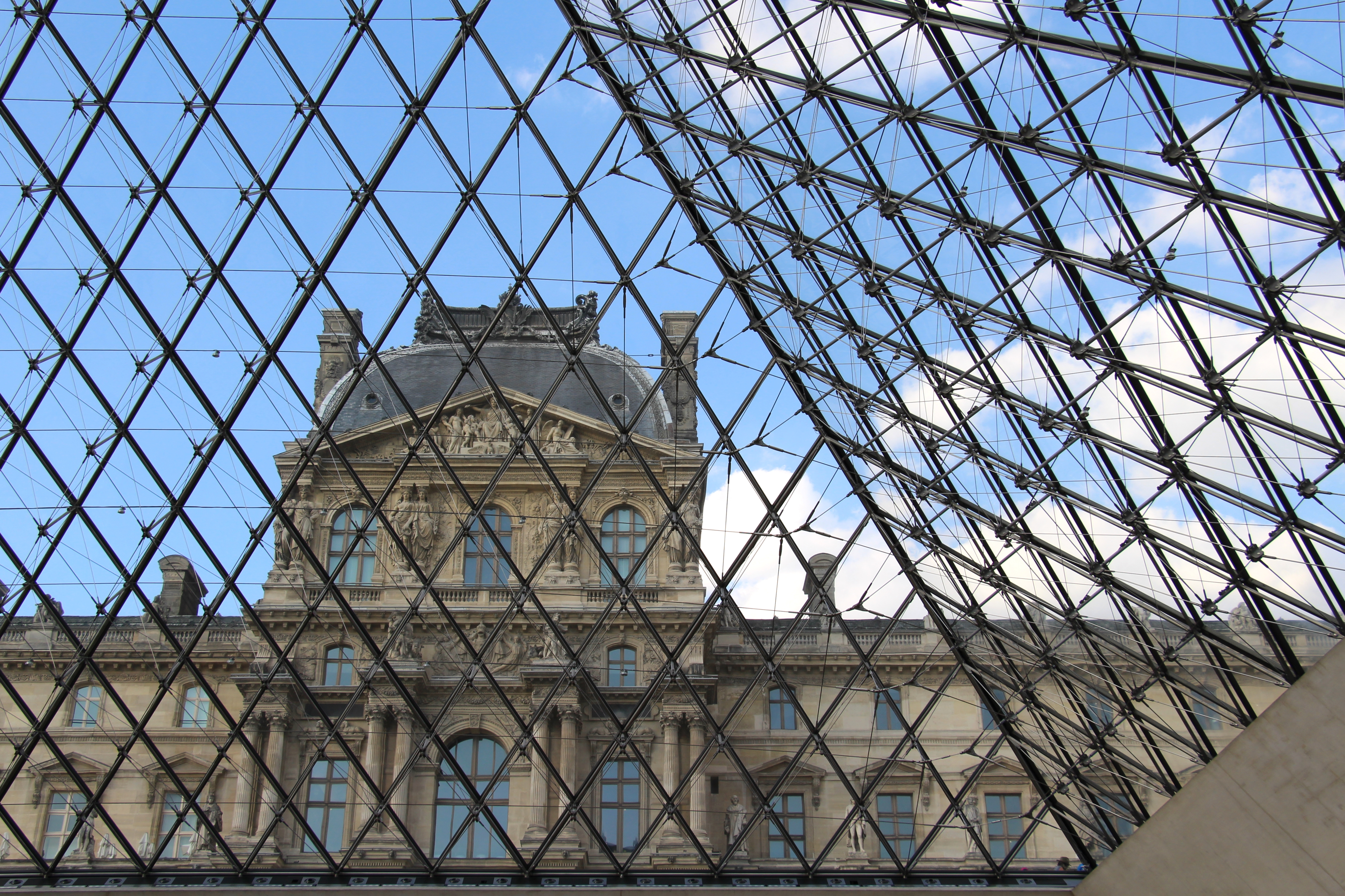
The pavillon Richelieu seen through the pyramid

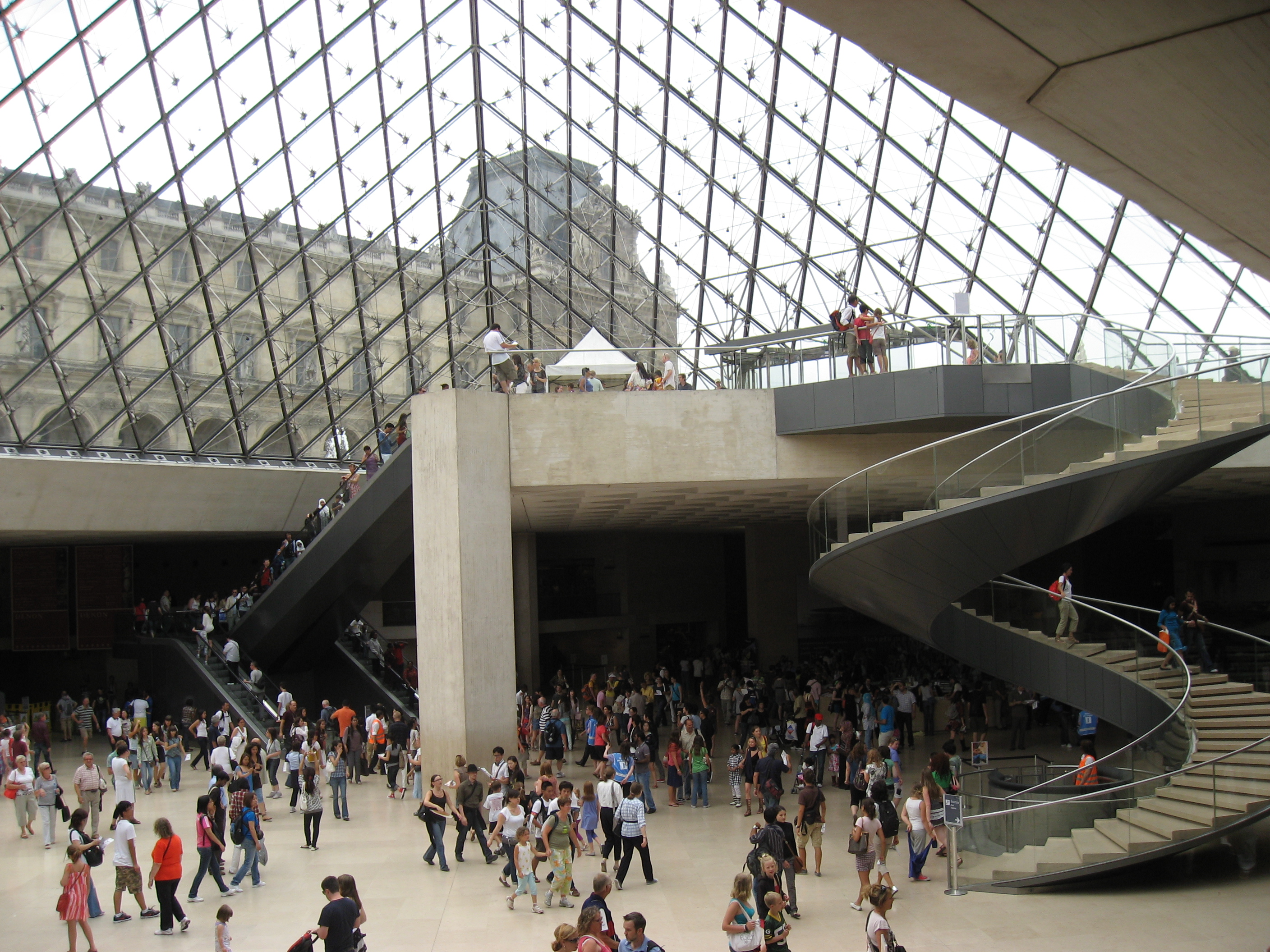
Spiral staircase in the Hall Napoléon

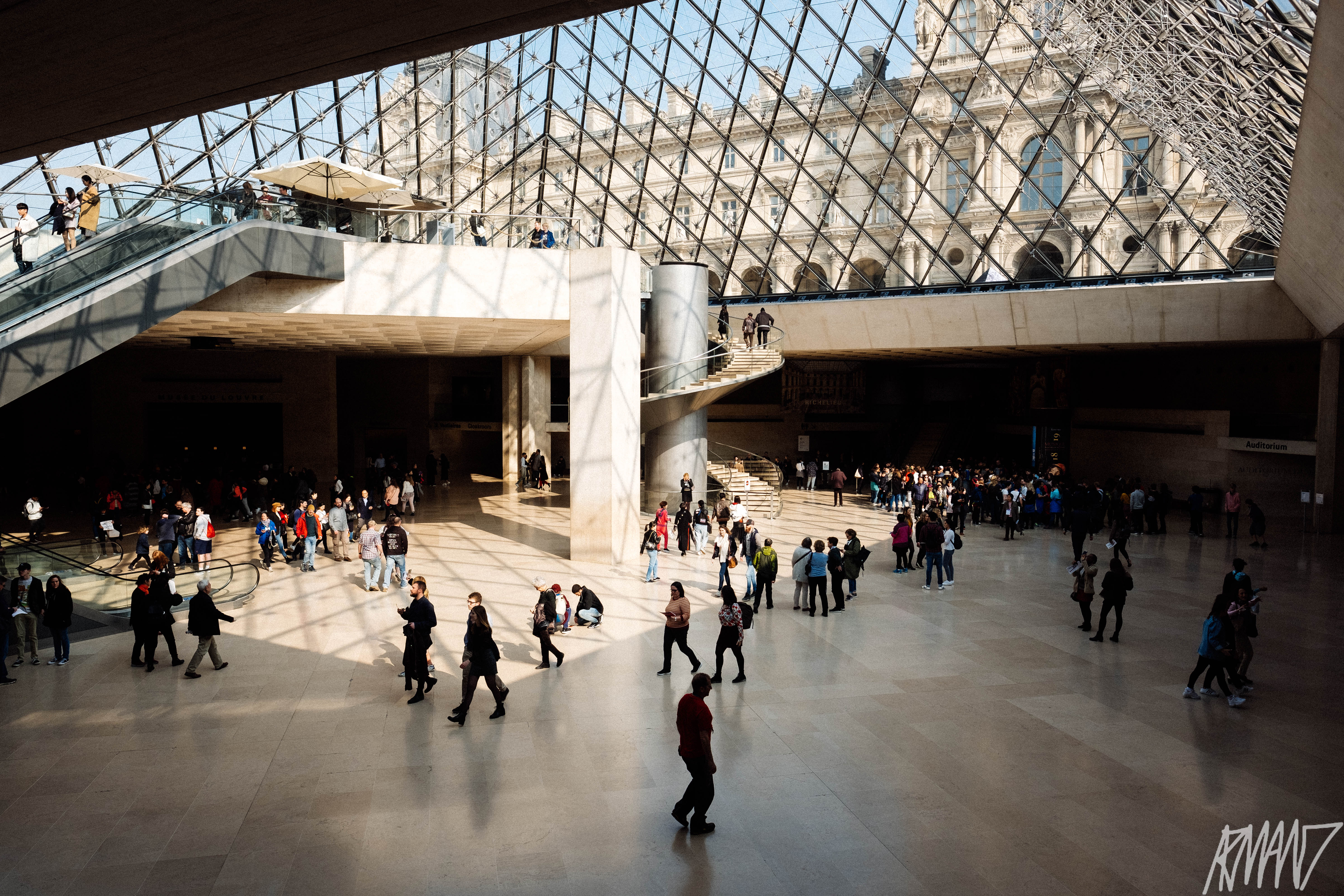
Hall Napoléon with Richelieu Wing in background

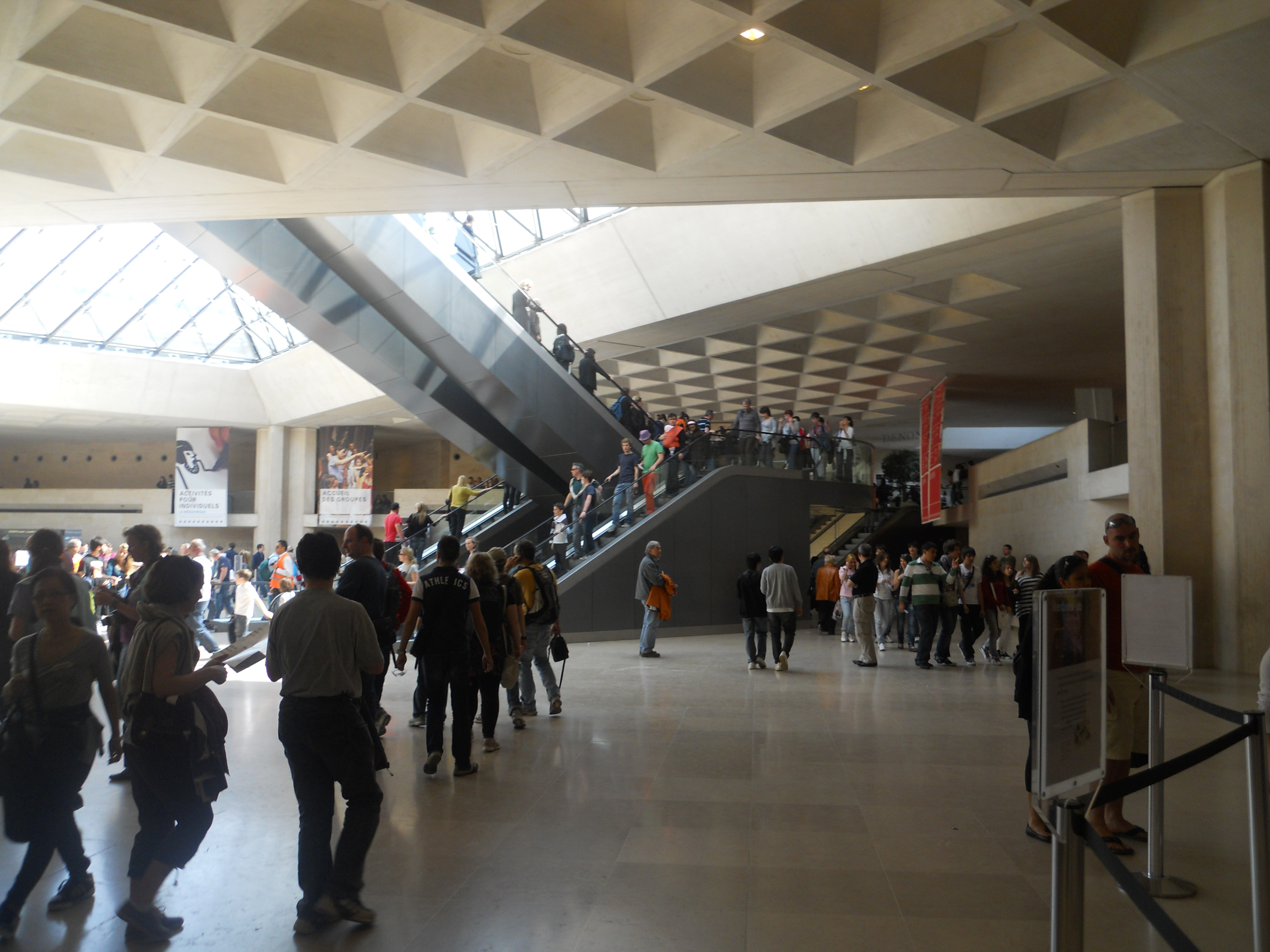
Escalators in the Hall Napoléon

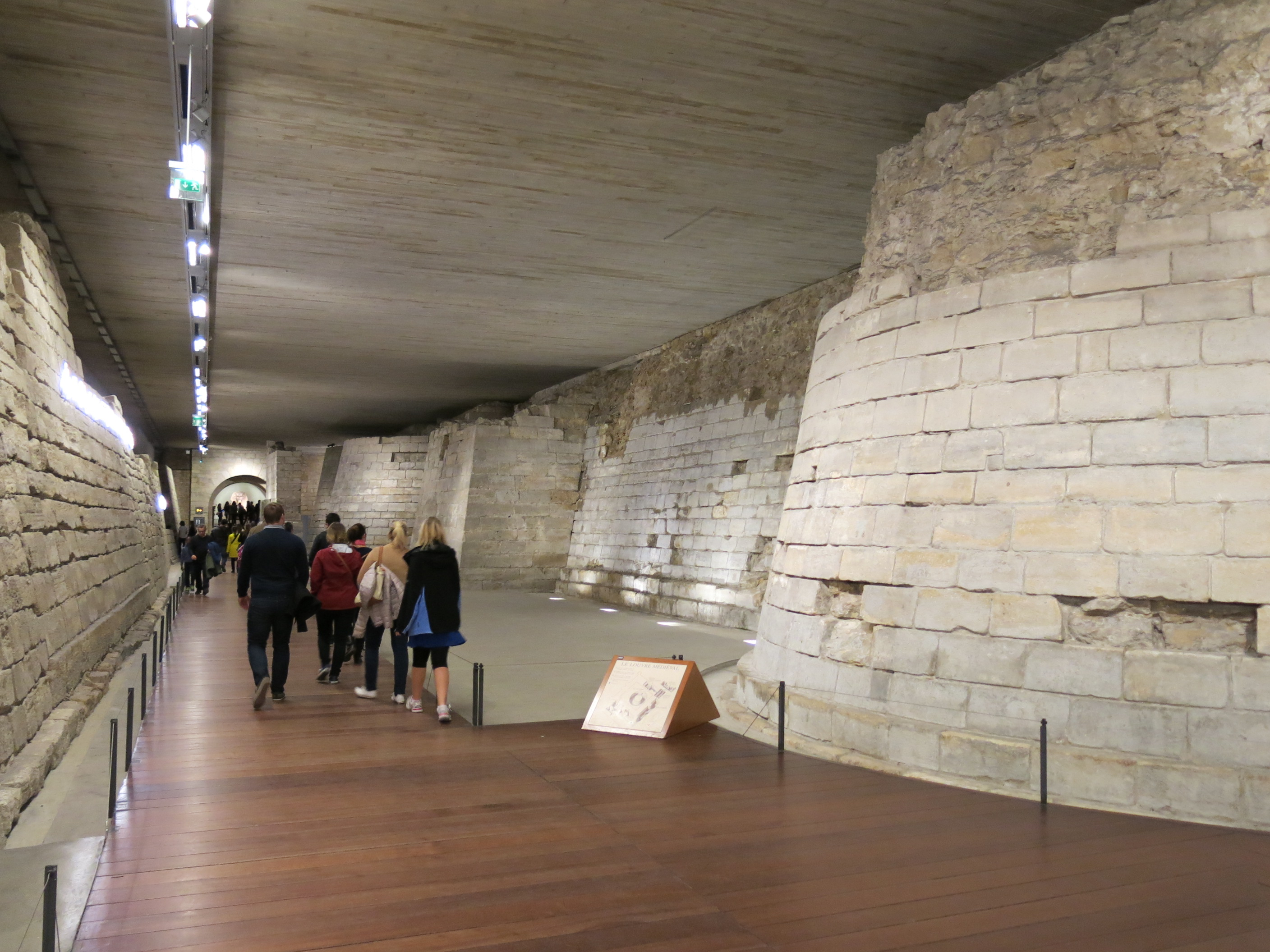
Renovated moat of the Medieval Louvre

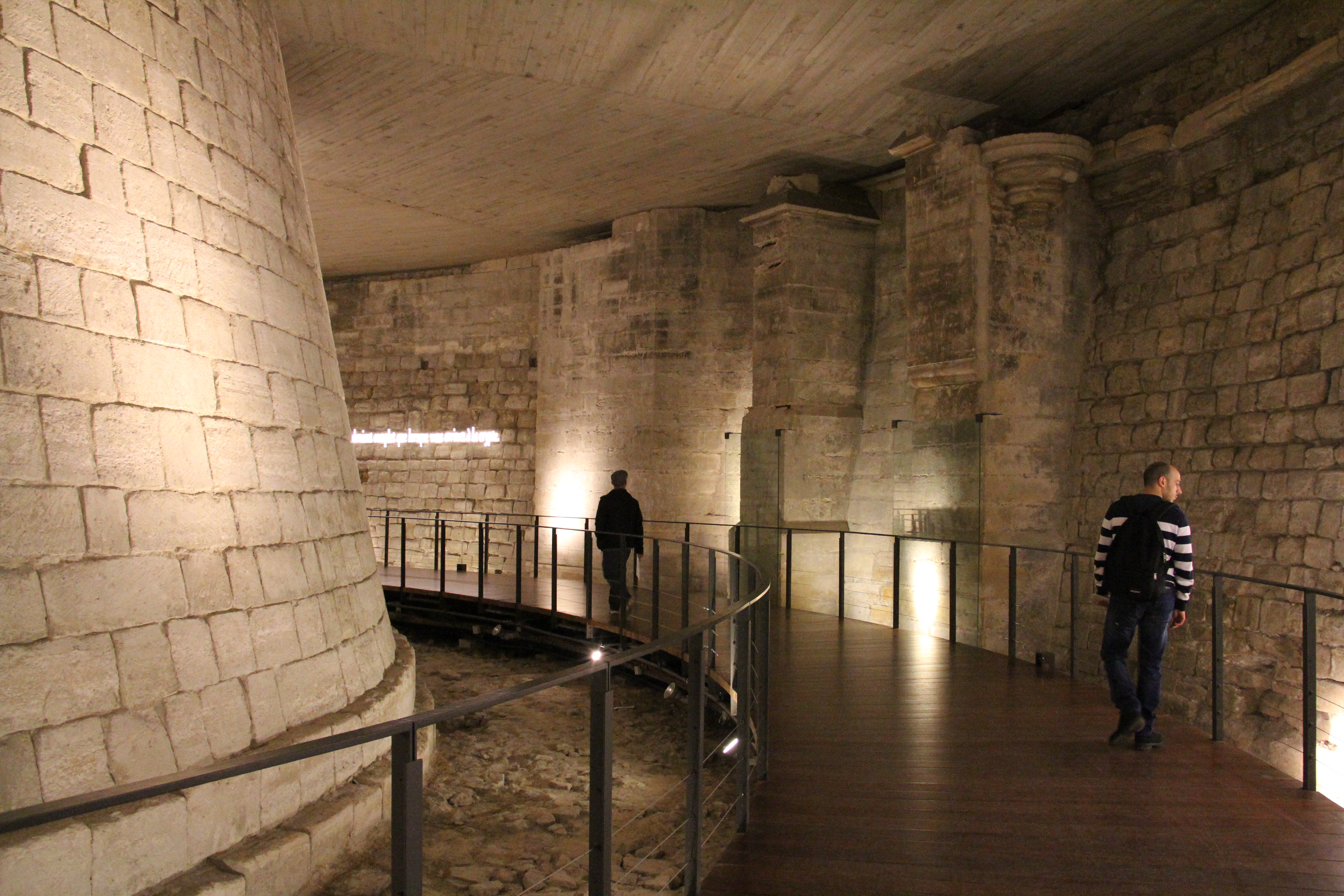
Renovated ditch around the medieval keep

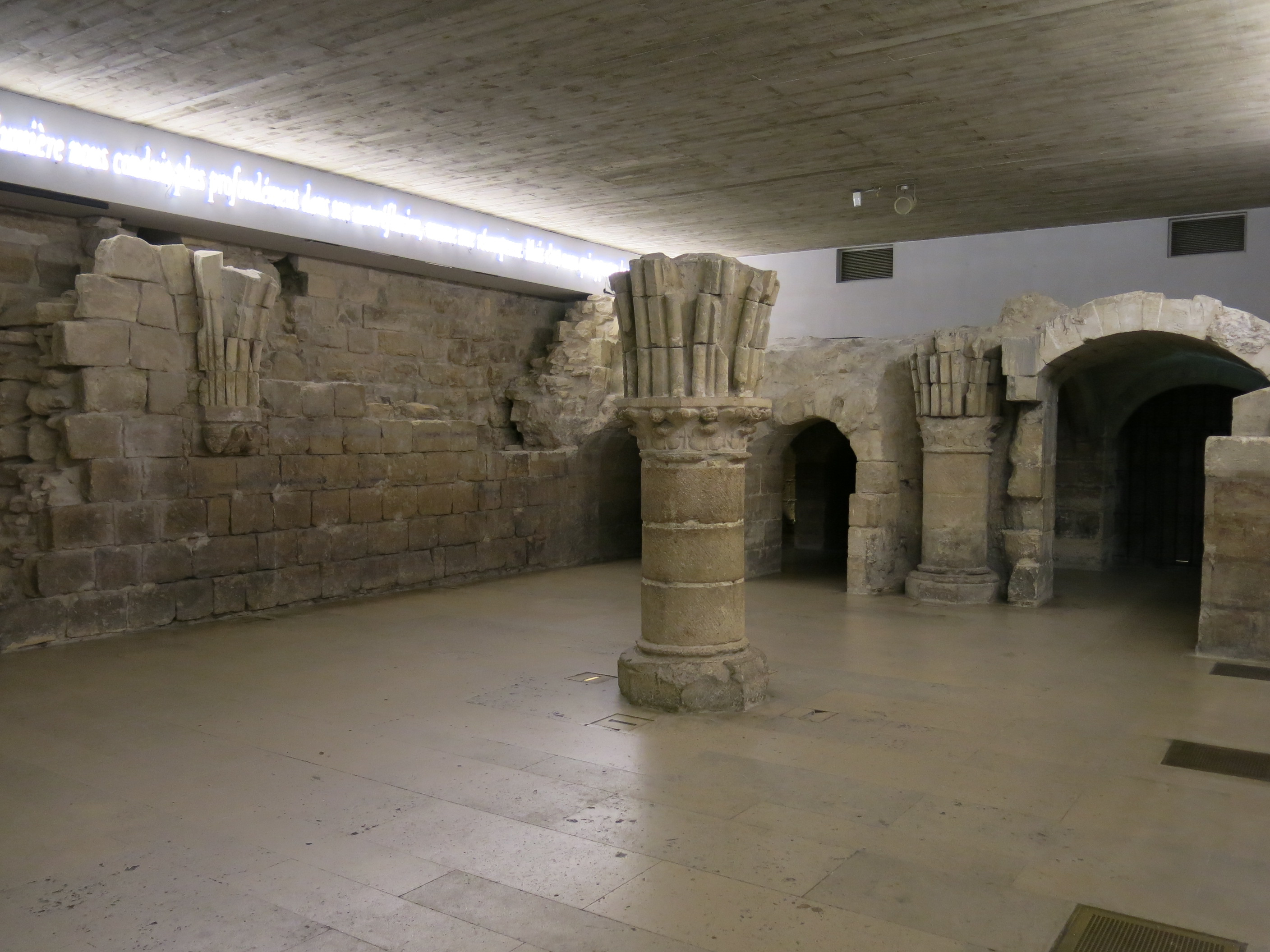
Salle Saint-Louis

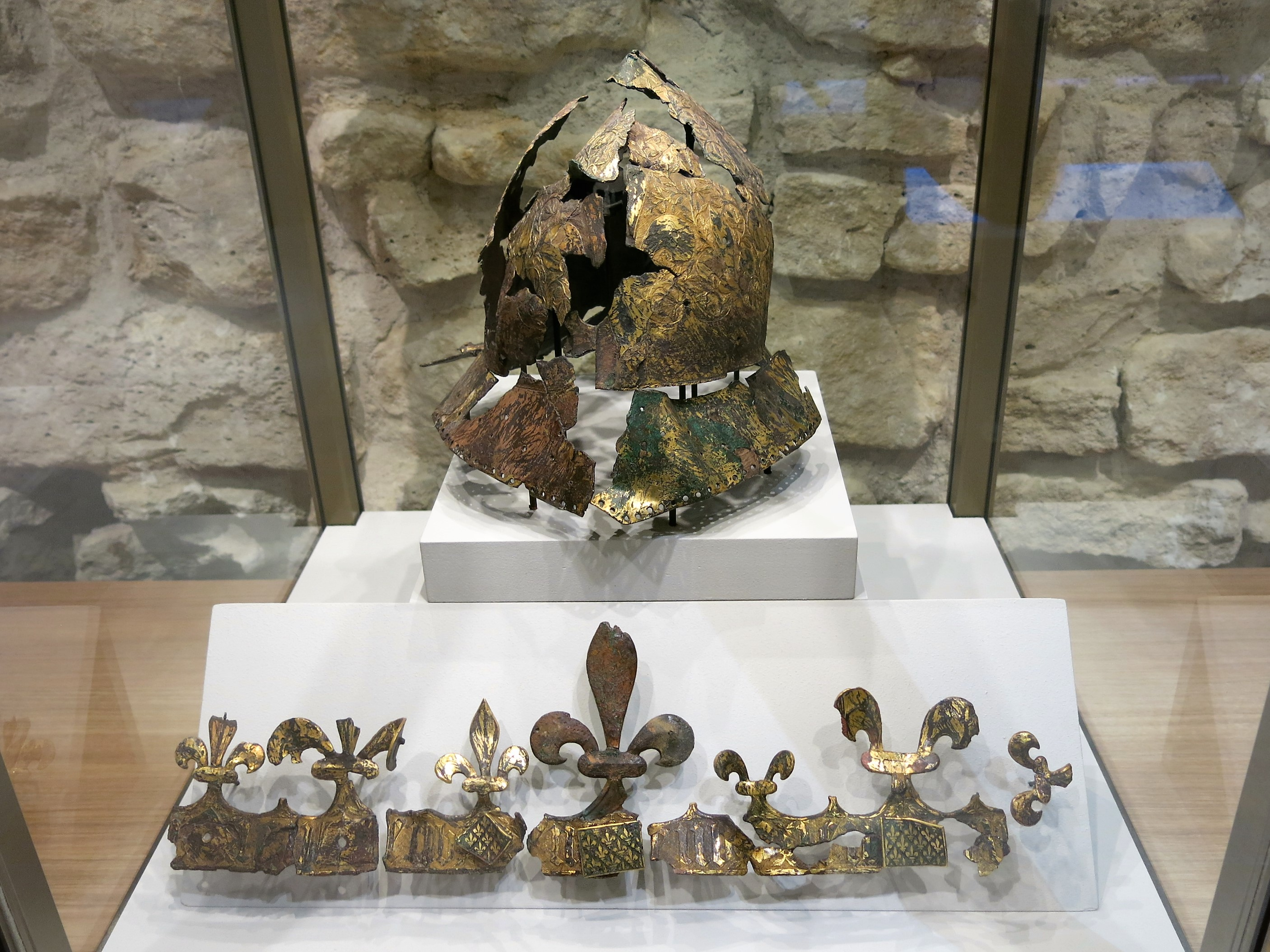
remains of a ceremonial helmet of King Charles VI found in the excavations

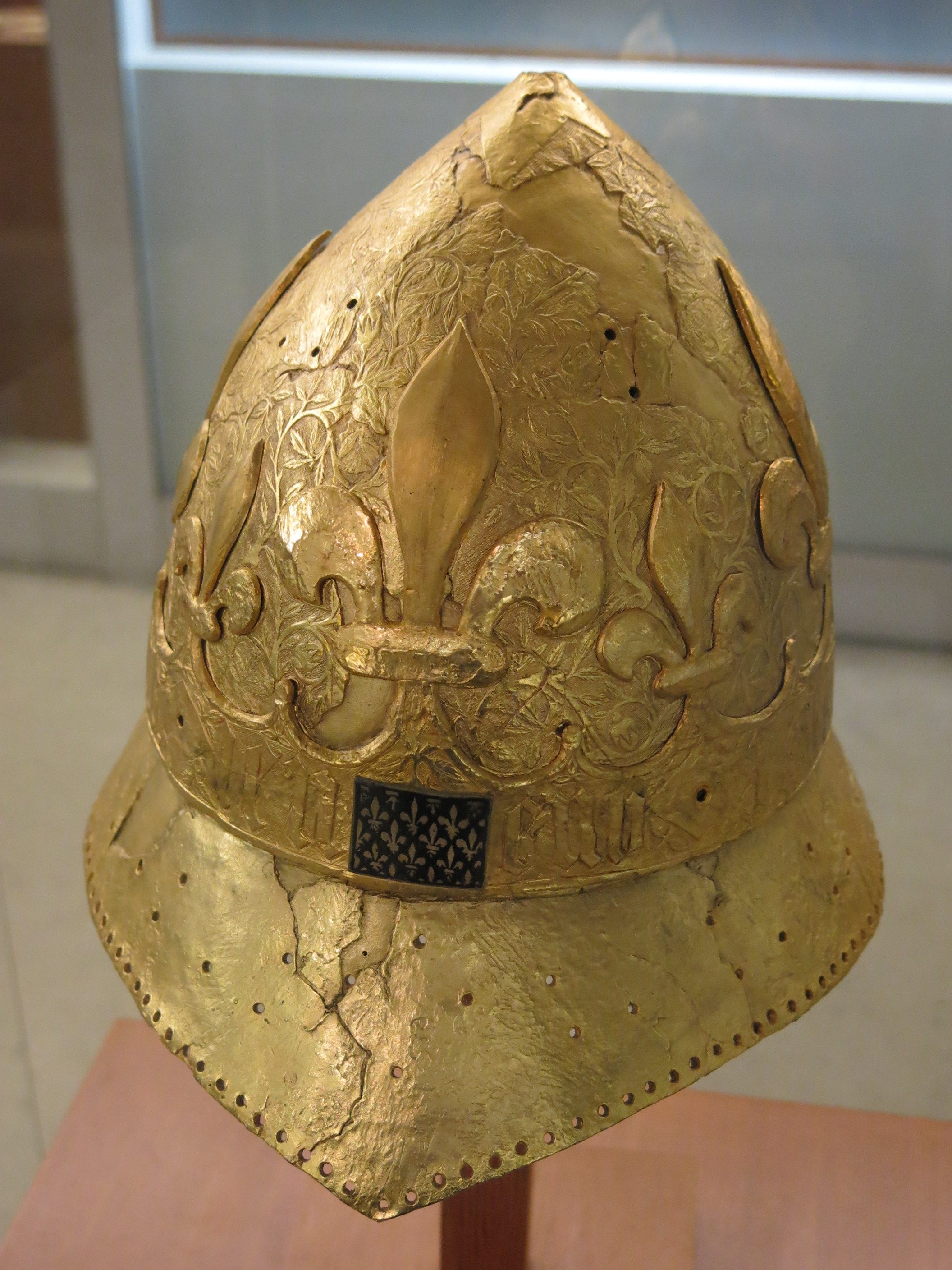
Reconstruction of Charles VI's helmet

== Second Phase: Richelieu Wing and Carrousel Mall ==
On 18 November 1993, Mitterrand inaugurated the next major phase of the Grand Louvre plan: the renovated North (Richelieu) Wing in the former Finance Ministry site, the museum's largest single expansion in its entire history, designed by Pei, his French associate Michel Macary, and Jean-Michel Wilmotte. In January 2000 and July 2001 respectively, a few more rooms opened on the Western end of the Richelieu Wing, of 19th-century decorative arts (first floor) and Northern European paintings (second floor).

Further underground spaces known as the Carrousel du Louvre, centered on the Pyramide Inversée (inverted pyramid) and designed by Pei and Macary, had opened in stages during October and November 1993. Like in the first phase, this had started in May 1989 with an excavation campaign, which uncovered a long section of the 14th century Wall of Charles V.

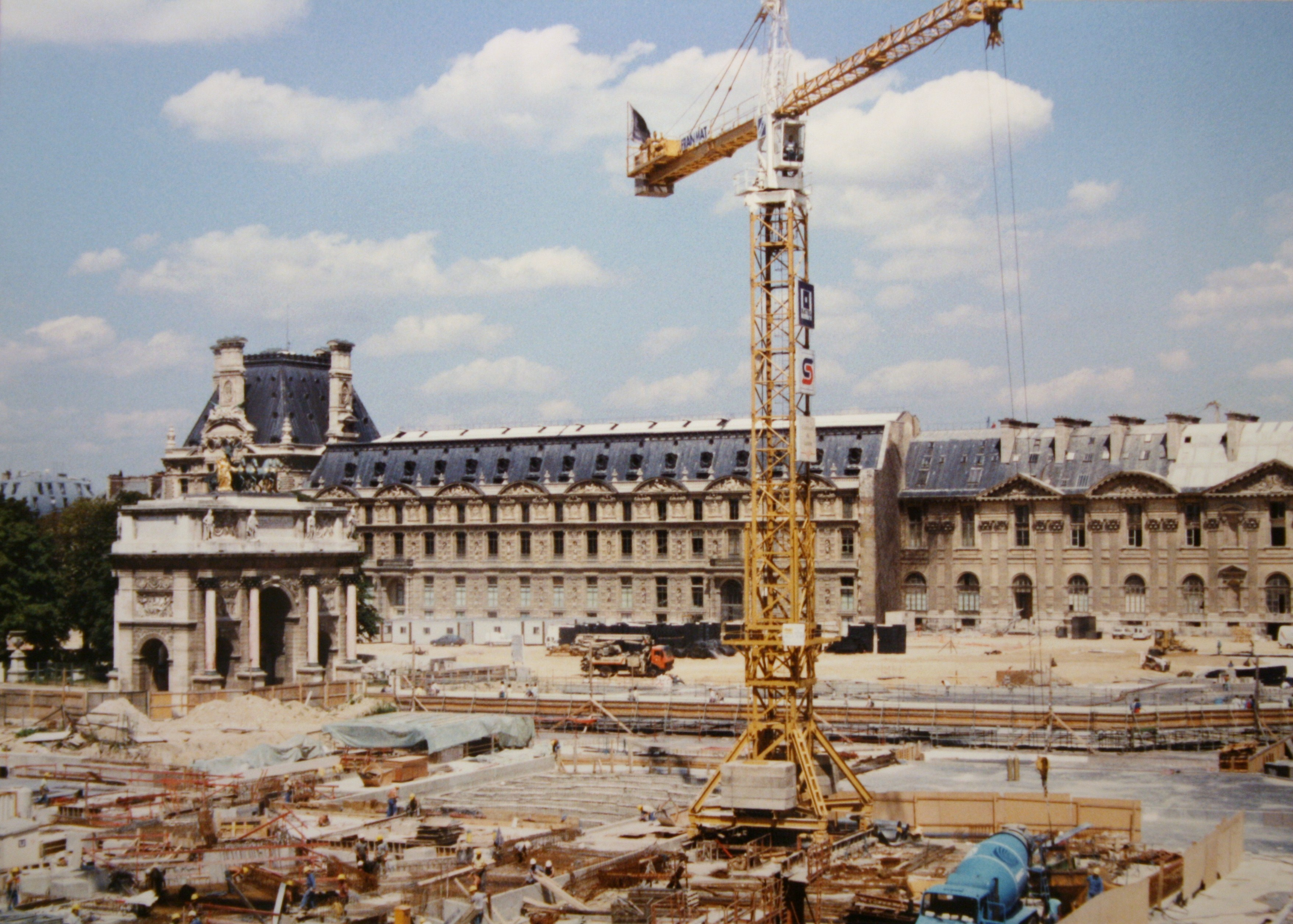
The Carrousel du Louvre under construction, 1993

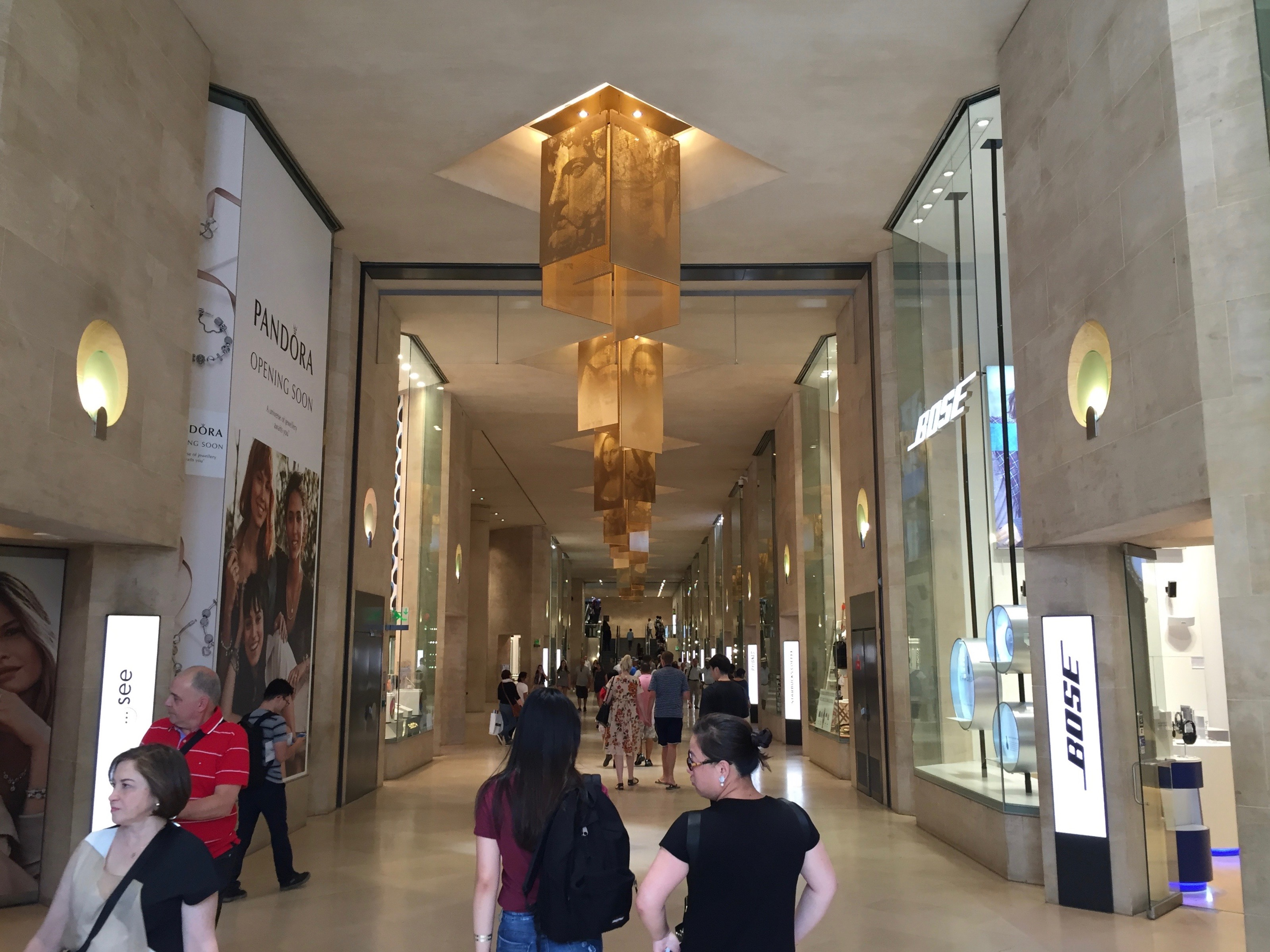
Carrousel du Louvre shopping center

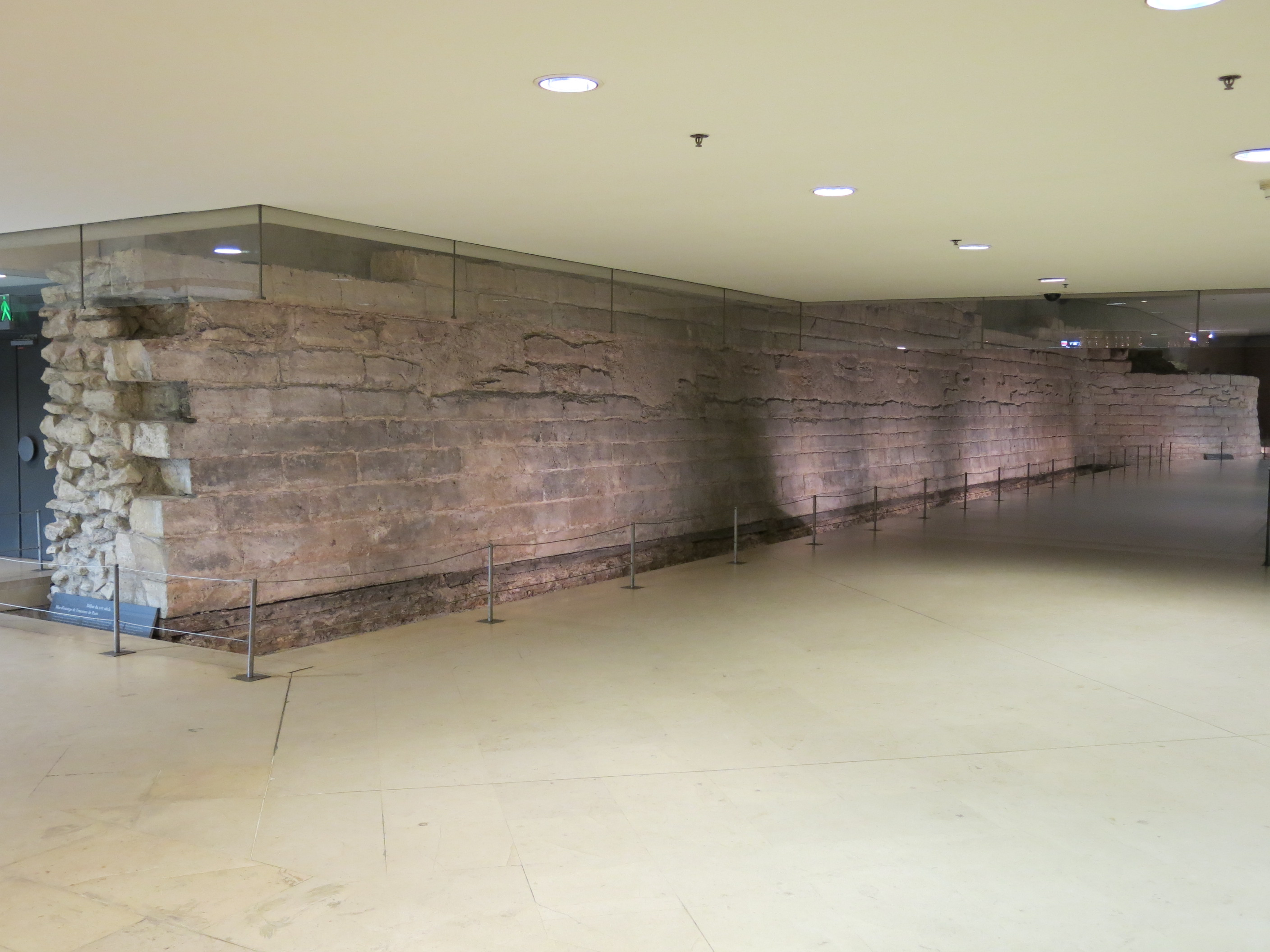
Wall of Charles V in the Carrousel du Louvre

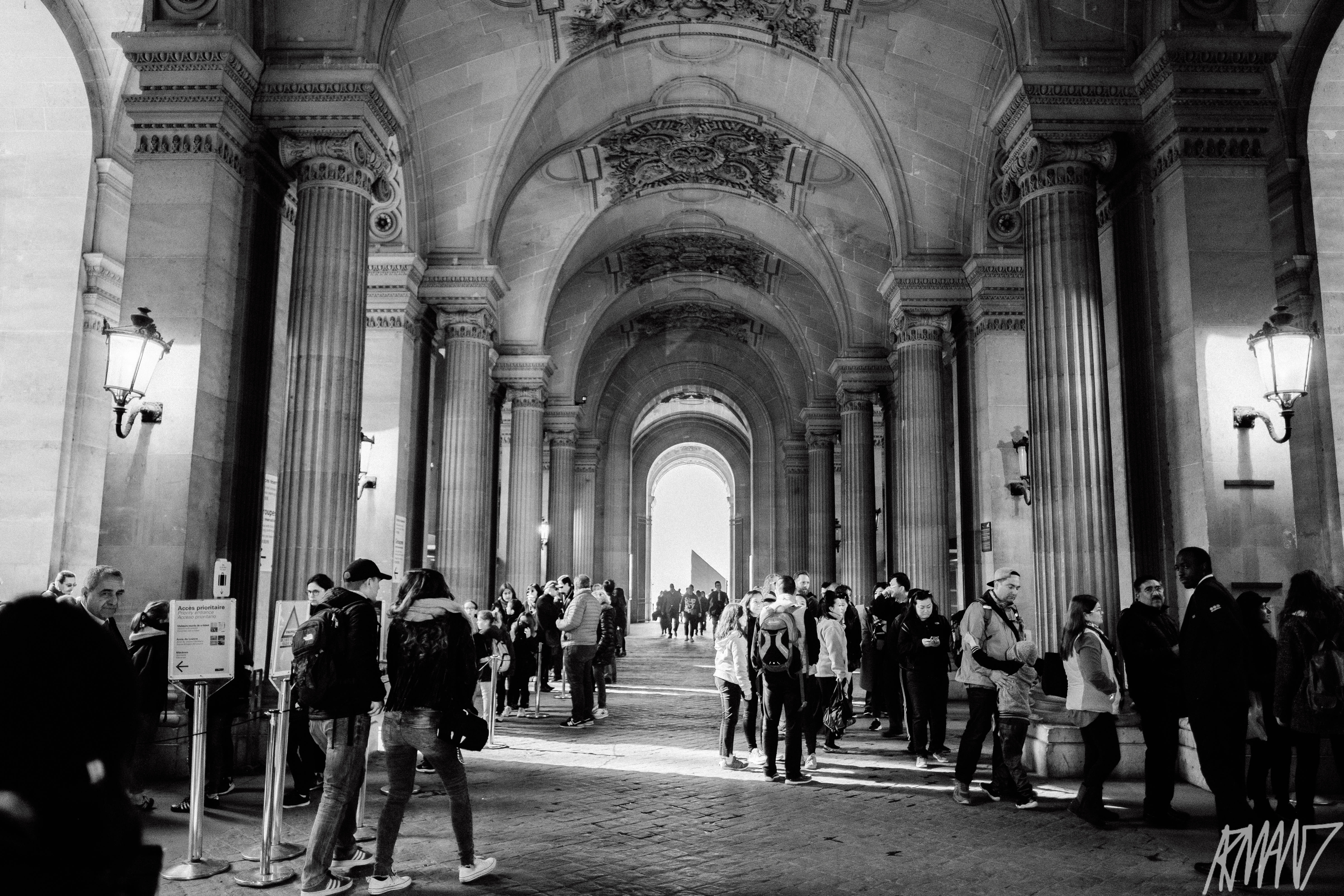
Reopened Passage Richelieu

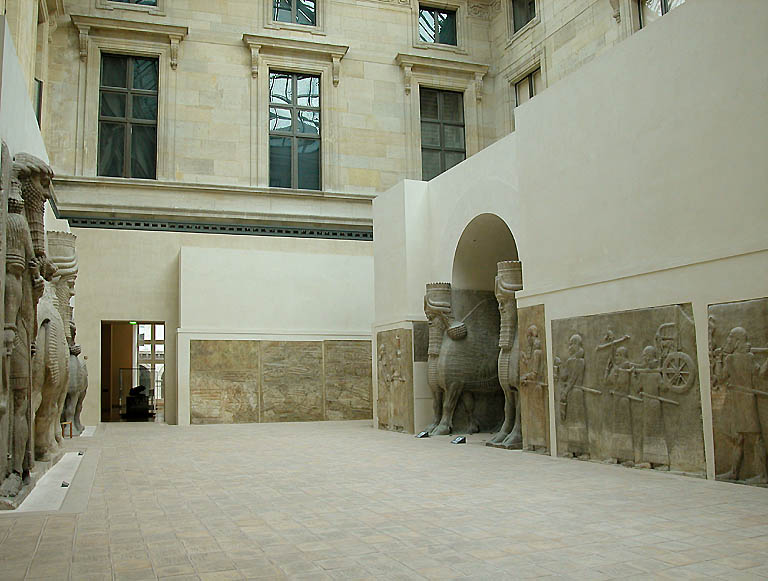
Cour Khorsabad

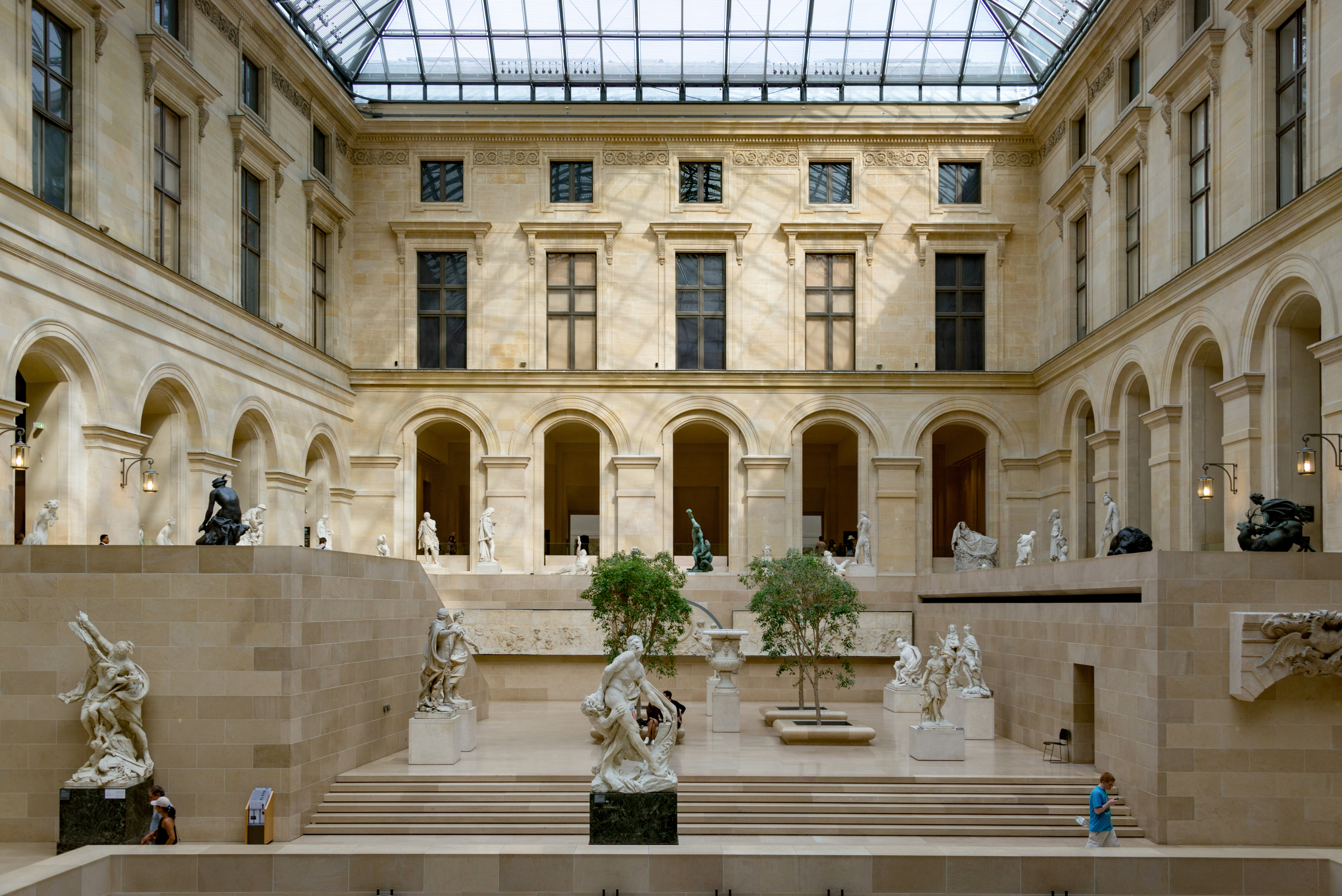
Cour Puget

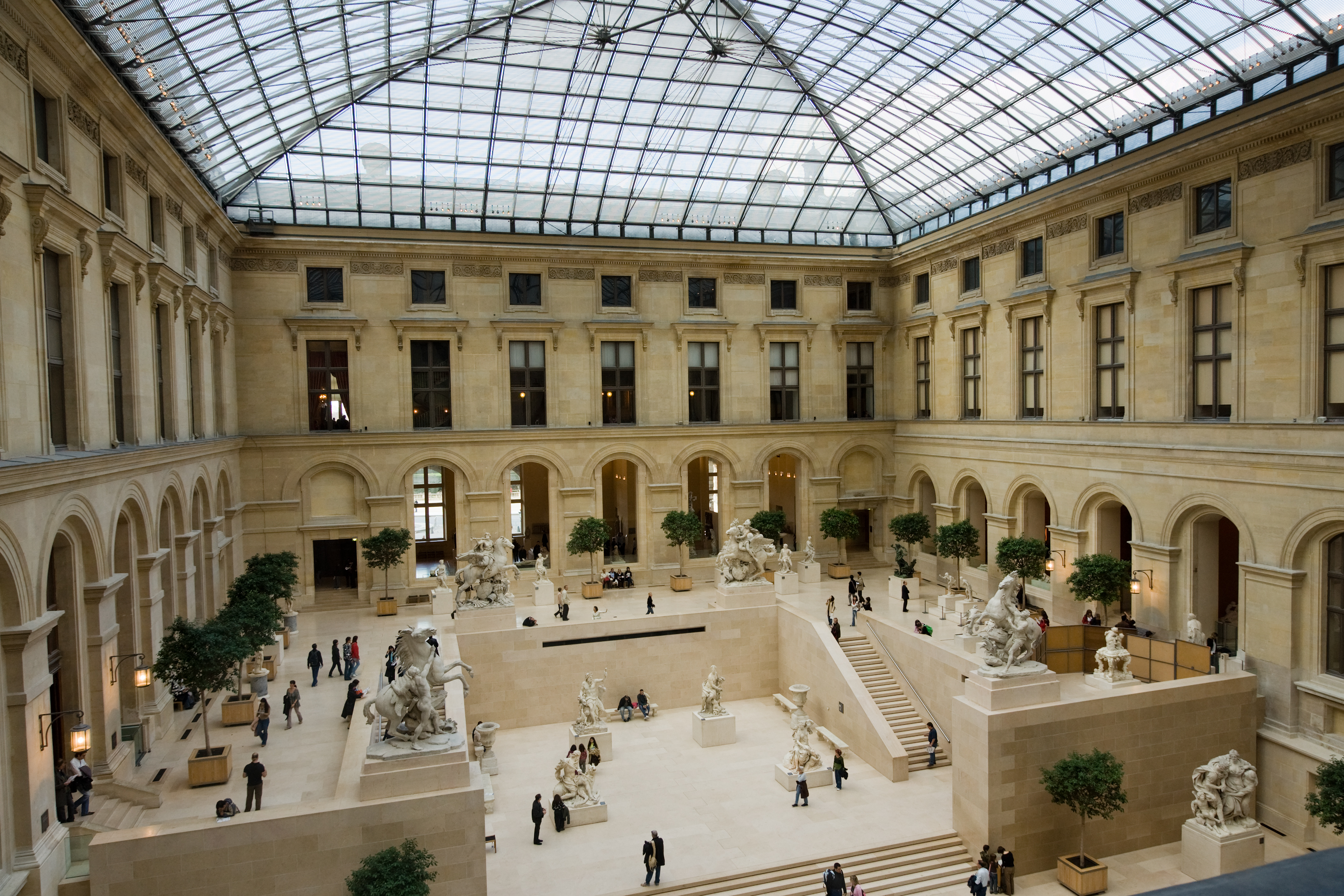
Cour Marly

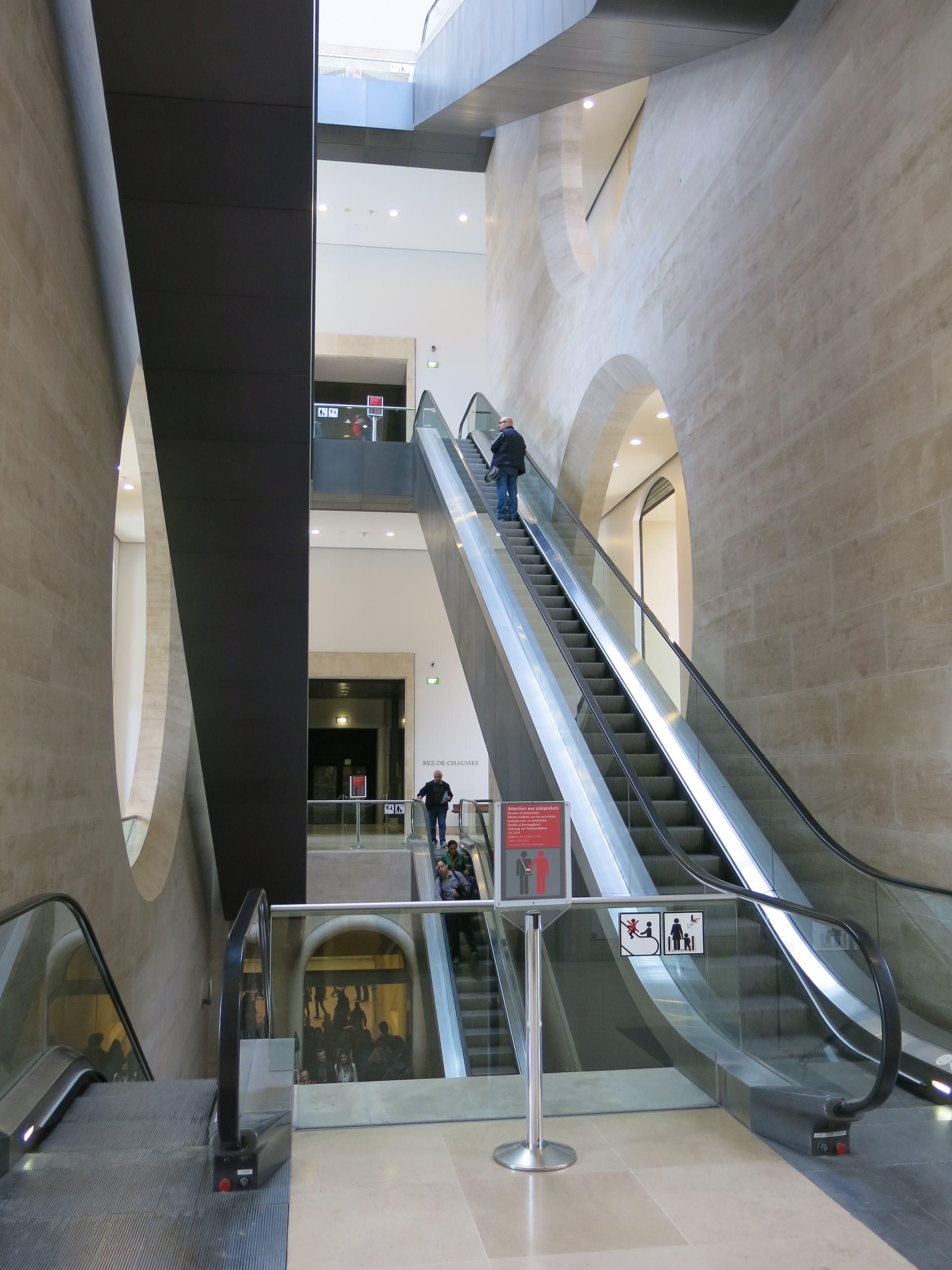
Escalators in Richelieu Wing

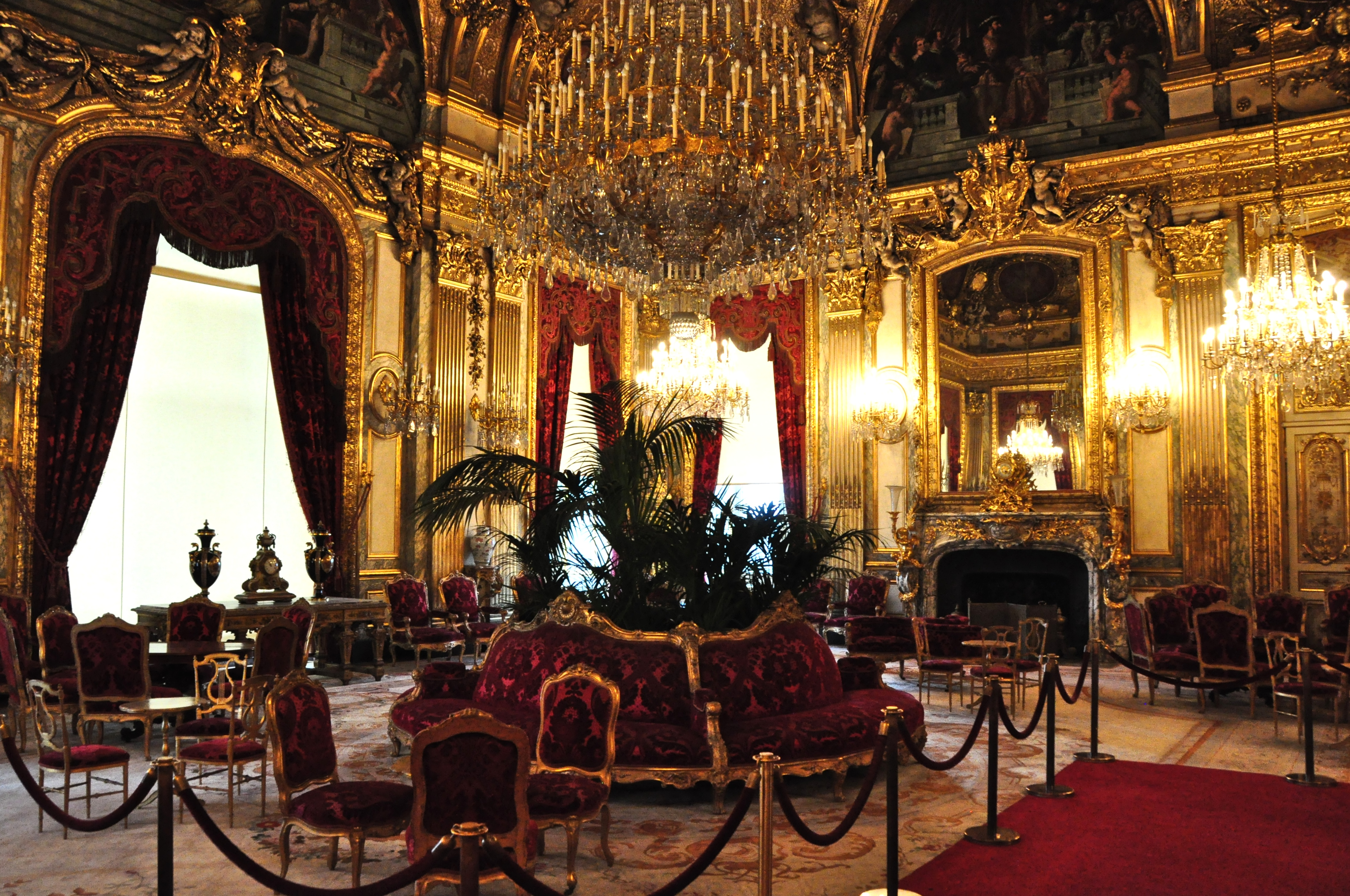
The appartements Napoléon III in the Richelieu Wing

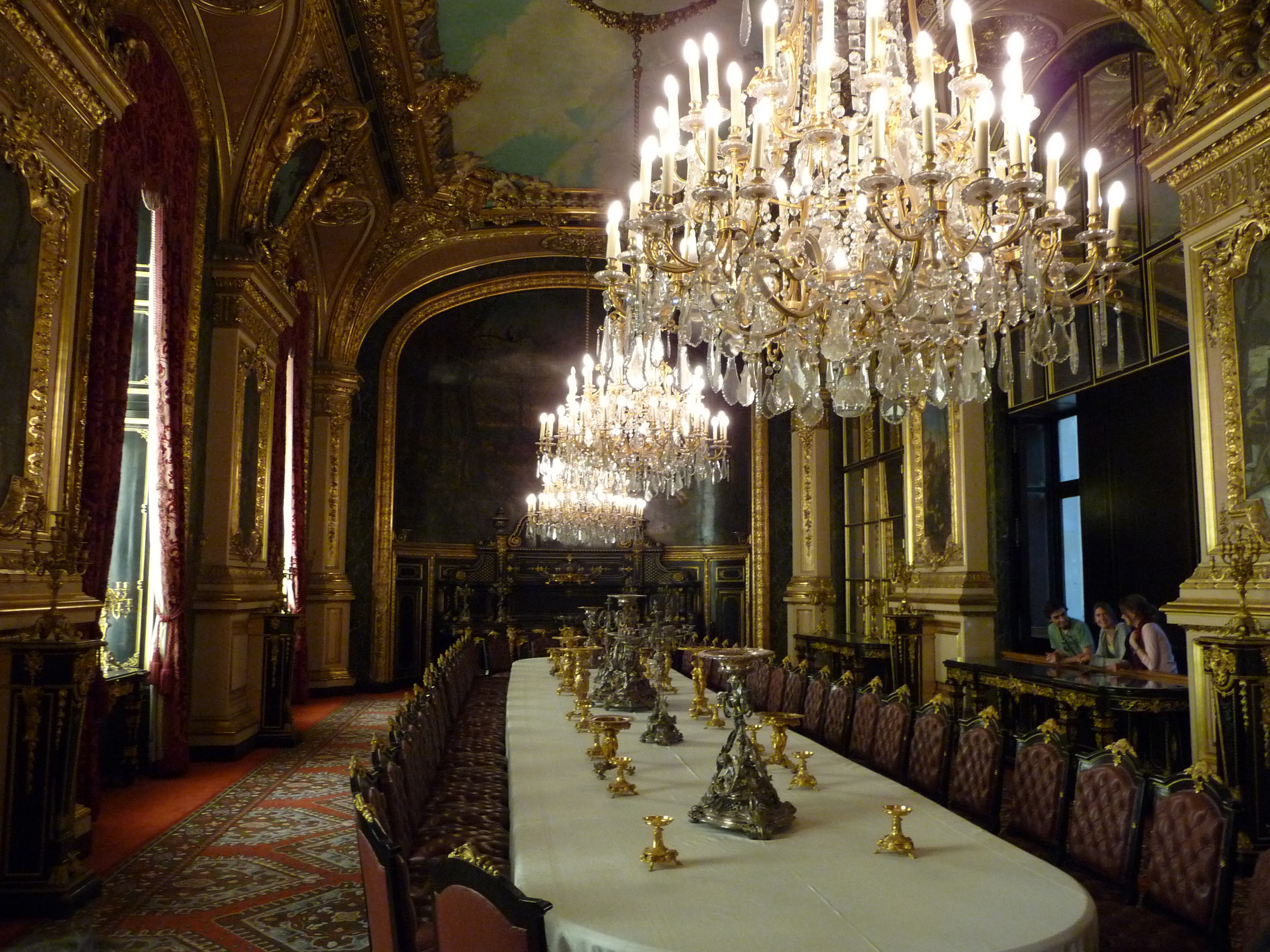
Dining room of the appartements Napoléon III

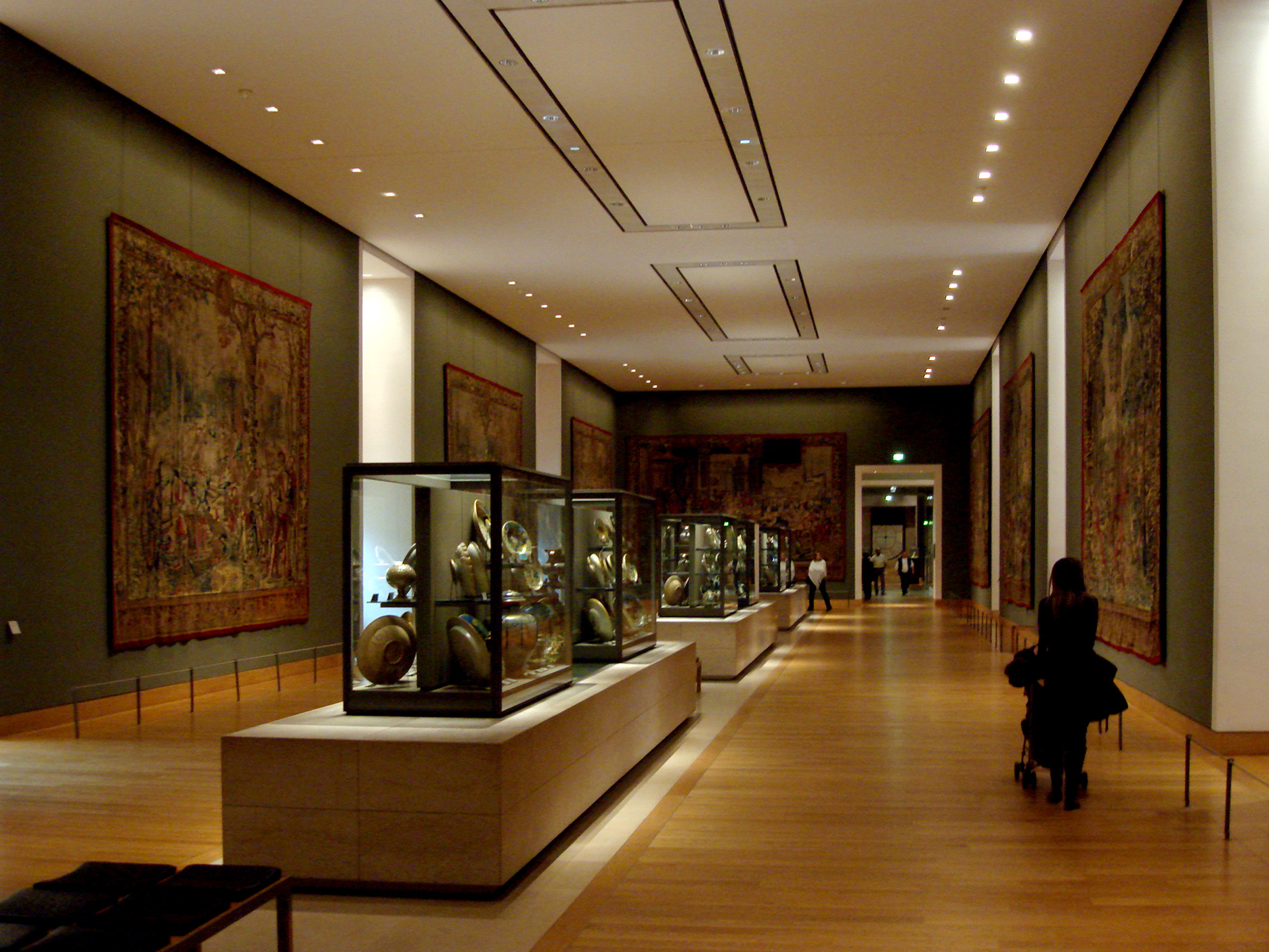
First-floor decorative arts section designed by Jean-Michel Wilmotte

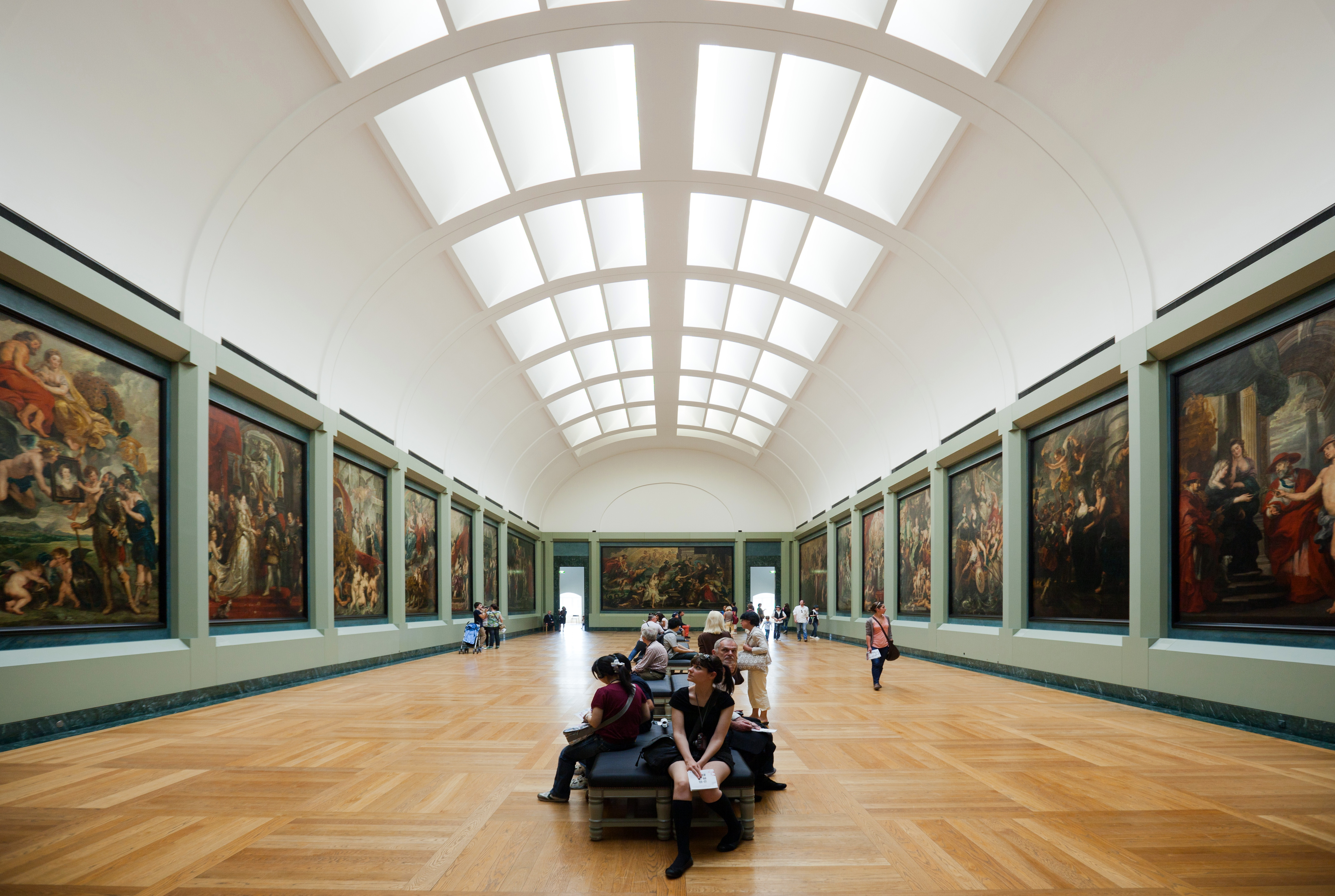
Salle Rubens designed by I. M. Pei, with the Marie de' Medici cycle

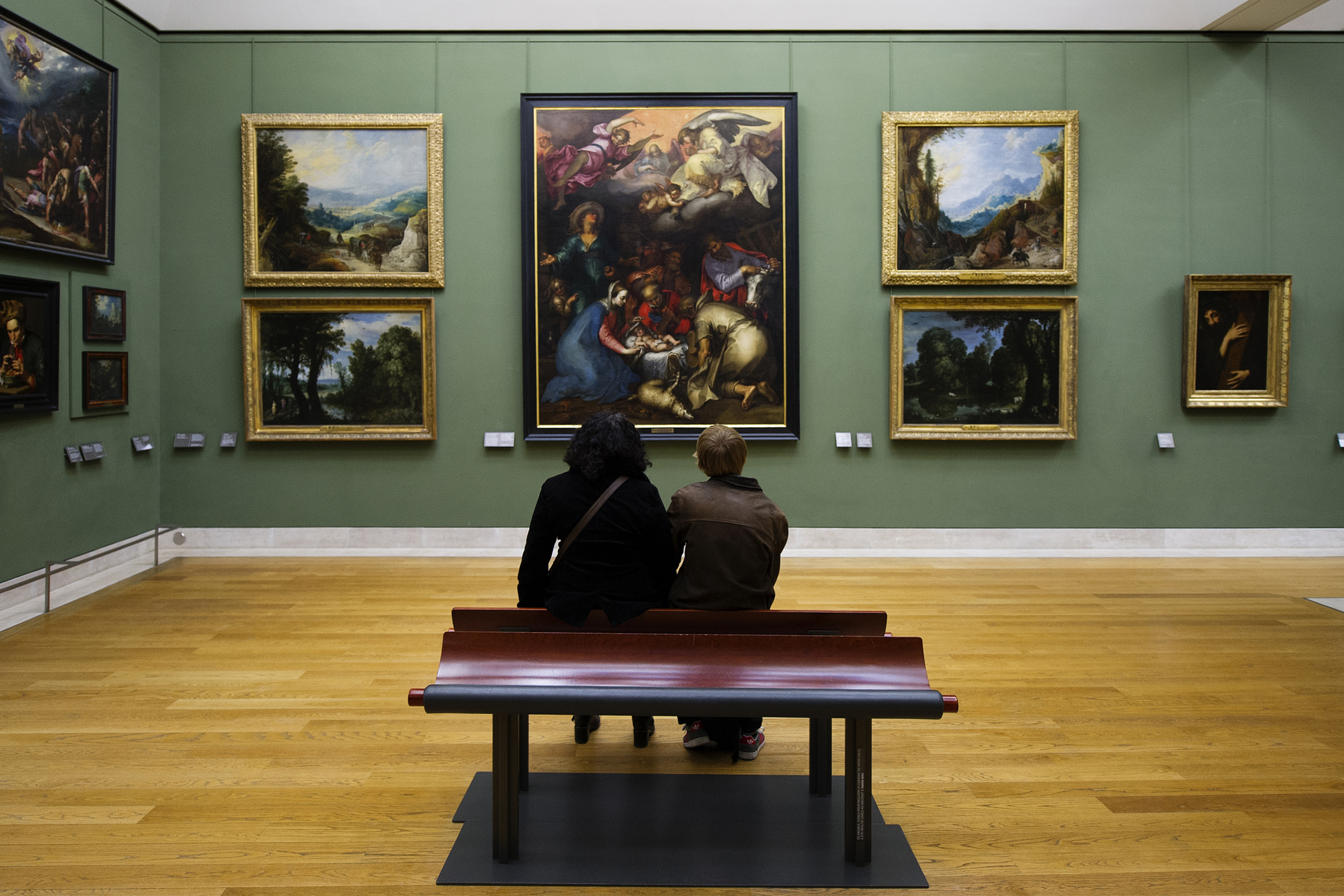
One of the second-floor rooms displaying Northern European paintings

== Third Phase: Sully and Denon Wings ==
The third phase was less spectacular than the first two, as it involved the renovation and technical upgrading of spaces that for the most part had already been part of the museum before the Grand Louvre started. Air conditioning was installed in the galleries, not least the Grand Gallery which had been notorious for its hot summers.

New galleries of foreign sculpture opened on 28 October 1994. More rooms of Italian paintings and Greek, Etruscan and Roman antiquities opened on 21 January 1997. The renovated Middle Eastern Antiquities spaces, named "Sackler Wing" in 1997 in response to financial support from the Sackler family (that naming was reversed in 2019), opened on 10 October 1997. A large number of additional renovated rooms opened on 21 December 1997 including Egyptian and classical antiquities, Italian paintings and drawings. The new rooms of the Department of Egyptian Antiquities, designed by Atelier de l'Ile, included unprecedented space for Coptic art, e.g. the reconstituted Bawit monastery church from Upper Egypt. On 28 October 1998, the renovated rooms of the Campana collection opened in the southern wing of the Cour Carrée. Room renovations in the Denon Wing included that of the Salle Percier et Fontaine and Salle Duchatel, designed by Yves Lion and executed in 1997–1998. A new entrance at the Porte des Lions, also designed by Yves Lion's architecture firm, opened on 22 May 1999, leading on the first floor to new rooms of Spanish paintings. Meanwhile, the Carrousel Garden was recreated on plans by Jacques Wirtz between 1991 and 2001.

From the 2000s, any remaining parts of the Grand Louvre's implementation become increasingly indistinguishable from the ongoing operation and projects of the Louvre Museum. New galleries on the Roman-era Eastern Mediterranean (Orient méditerranéen dans l'Empire Romain), initially included in the successive Grand Louvre plans as "trois antiques" (since they blend objects from the three departments of Egyptian, Oriental, and Classical antiquities), opened in September 2012 together with the new department of Islamic art, whose creation on Jacques Chirac's initiative was not labeled as part of the Grand Louvre. As late as March 2021, the President of the Louvre referred to the "Grand Louvre program" as relevant and "still unfinished", with specific reference to sections of the Denon Wing that still await renovation.

== Project management and administration ==
From the start of the project, Mitterrand endeavored to ring-fence the Grand Louvre project from the hostile finance ministry and the normal interagency decision-making process. By tradition, the Louvre Museum had very little autonomy, with curatorial policy steered by the Culture Ministry's Direction des Musées and commercial/outreach policy in the hands of the Réunion des Musées Nationaux. Each of the seven departments acted as a separate curatorial fiefdom, and human resources issues were partly delegated to the powerful employees' unions.

Mitterrand appointed Émile Biasini, an experienced administrator, first as project manager on 17 September 1982 and then as president of the Etablissement Public du Grand Louvre (EPGL), a semi-permanent project organization created on 2 November 1983 and maintained until July 1998. Biasini retired in July 1987 and was succeeded as EPGL President by Pierre-Yves Ligen (1987–1989) and Jean Lebrat (1989–1998); from 1988 to 1992 he was state secretary (junior minister) in charge of the grands travaux. In July 1998, the project was substantially completed and the remaining coordination tasks were transferred to the newly created national service now known as the opérateur du patrimoine et des projets immobiliers de la culture.

For the management of the museum itself, a self-standing Établissement Public du Musée du Louvre was created on 22 December 1992, headed by the Director of the Louvre Museum. The Louvre's management autonomy was further strengthened in the early 2000s.

== Assessment ==
The Grand Louvre project cost over a billion euros. It more than tripled the Louvre's surface area, from 57,000 to almost 180,000 square meters. Within that, the exhibition space almost doubled from 31,000 to 60,000 square meters, and the number of exhibits on display increased from 20,600 to over 34,000. Museum attendance more than doubled, from an average 2.8 million visitors per year in 1980–1988 to over 5 million in 1990–2001.

As early as the late 1980s, when the pyramid opened, it had become widely accepted as an architectural success, even by many of its former critics. Pei's project has won further praise since then. On Pei's death at age 102 in 2019, his New York Times obituary noted: "Within a few years the pyramid had become an accepted, and generally admired, symbol of a re-energized Paris." Pei himself had called his time working on the Louvre project, from 1983 to 1993, "the 10 most exciting years of my life."

The American Institute of Architects gave Pei's firm its prestigious Twenty-five Year Award in 2017, noting that the pyramid "now rivals the Eiffel Tower as one of France’s most recognizable architectural icons (...) Pei wove together an unprecedented amount of cultural sensitivity, political acumen, innovation, and preservation skill", with one of the jurors adding that it "established a benchmark for new, modern architecture that enriches an historic setting with integrity and respect for both history and progress."

Other awards won by Pei Cobb Freed & Partners for the project include the prix d'excellence of the Associations des Ingénieurs Conseils du Canada (1989); the First Prize, Structural-Buildings Category of the New York Association of Consulting Engineers (1988); the Design Award of the European Convention for Constructional Steelwork (1989); the prix spécial of the Syndicat de la construction métallique de France (1988); the Grand Award of the American Concrete Institute, Central New York Chapter (1989); and Le Moniteur's Equerre d'Argent / Prix Spécial Grands Projets Parisiens (1989).

Several of the project's protagonists published books specifically dedicated to their Grand Louvre experience, including Biasini, Pei, and Lang.

== See also ==
- Napoleon III's Louvre expansion
- Grands Projets of François Mitterrand
- Yann Weymouth

== Bibliography ==
- Bezombes, Dominique, editor (1994). The Grand Louvre: History of a Project. Paris: Le Moniteur. ISBN 9782281190793.
- Biasini, Émile; Jean Lebrat; Dominique Bezombes; Jean-Michel Vincent (1989). The Grand Louvre: A Museum Transfigured 1981–1993. Milan/Paris: Electa Moniteur. ISBN 9782866530662.
