= Louvre Inverted Pyramid =

Skylight in the Carrousel du Louvre

Coordinates: 48°51′41.1″N 2°20′2.8″E

Part of the Louvre Inverted Pyramid

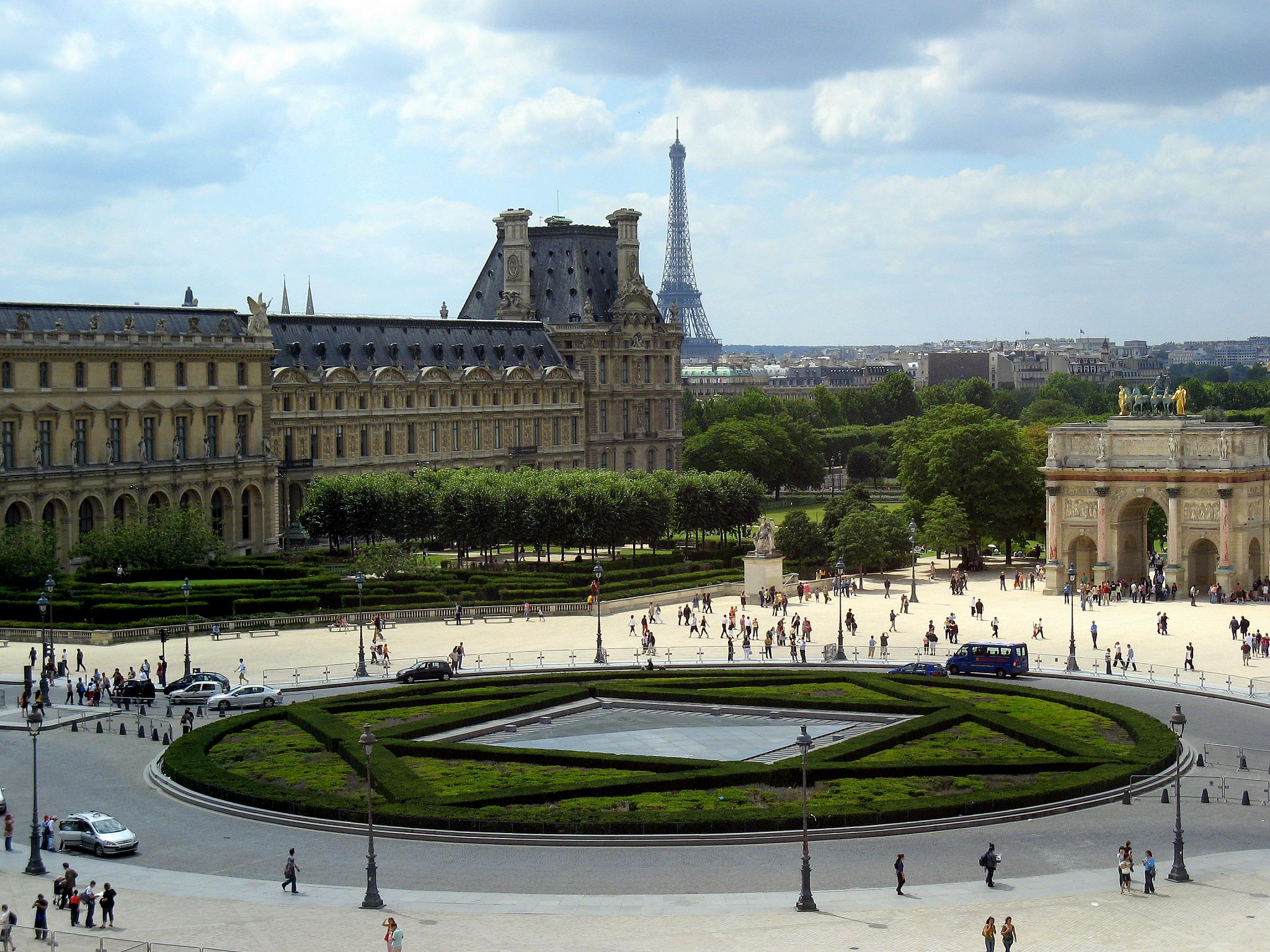
View of the square base of the Louvre's Inverted Pyramid, located in the middle of the roundabout of the Place du Carrousel

The Louvre Inverted Pyramid (French: Pyramide inversée du Louvre) is a skylight constructed in the Carrousel du Louvre, an underground shopping mall in front of the Louvre Museum in France. It may be thought of as a smaller sibling of the more famous Louvre Pyramid proper, yet turned upside down: its upturned base is easily seen from outside.

== Design ==
The inverted pyramid marks the intersection of two main underground walkways beneath the Place du Carrousel and orients visitors towards the museum entrance under the Cour Napoléon. Tensioned against a 30-tonne (33-short-ton), 13.3-metre (44 ft) square steel caisson frame, the inverted pyramidal shape in laminated glass points downward towards the floor. The glass of the pyramid itself is 10 millimetres (0.39 in) thick, while the glass above the pyramid at courtyard (ground) level, which must be able to support the weight of pedestrians, is 30 millimetres (1.2 in) thick. The tip of the pyramid is suspended 1.4 metres (4.6 ft) above floor level. Individual glass panes in the pyramid are connected by stainless-steel crosses 381 millimetres (15.0 in) in length. After dark, the structure is illuminated by a frieze of spotlights.

Directly below the tip of the downwards-pointing glass pyramid, a small stone pyramid (about 1 m, 3.3 ft) is stationed on the floor, as if mirroring the larger structure above: The tips of the two pyramids almost touch.

The Pyramide Inversée was designed by architect I.M. Pei, and installed as part of the Phase II government renovation of the Louvre Museum, known as the Grand Louvre project. It was completed in 1993. In 1995, it was a finalist in the Benedictus Awards, described by the jury as "a remarkable anti-structure ... a symbolic use of technology ... a piece of sculpture. It was meant as an object but it is an object to transmit light."

== The Da Vinci Code ==
The Inverted Pyramid figures prominently on the concluding pages of Dan Brown's 2003 international bestseller The Da Vinci Code. The protagonist of the novel, Robert Langdon, reads esoteric symbolism into the two pyramids: The Inverted Pyramid is perceived as a Chalice, a feminine symbol, whereas the stone pyramid below is interpreted as a Blade, a masculine symbol: the whole structure could thus express the union of the sexes. Moreover, Brown's protagonist concludes that the tiny stone pyramid is actually only the apex of a larger pyramid (possibly the same size as the inverted pyramid above), embedded in the floor as a secret chamber. This chamber is implied to enclose the body of Mary Magdalene.

At the climax of the 2006 film adaptation, the camera elaborately moves through the entire glass pyramid from above and then descends beneath the floor below to reveal the supposed hidden chamber under the tiny stone pyramid, containing the sarcophagus with the remains of Mary Magdalene.

In reality, the smaller stone pyramid does not form the tip of a larger pyramid. In fact, it can be pushed aside to facilitate maintenance and cleaning of the glass pyramid above.
