= Place du Carrousel =

Public square in central Paris, France

Coordinates: 48°51′43″N 2°19′58″E

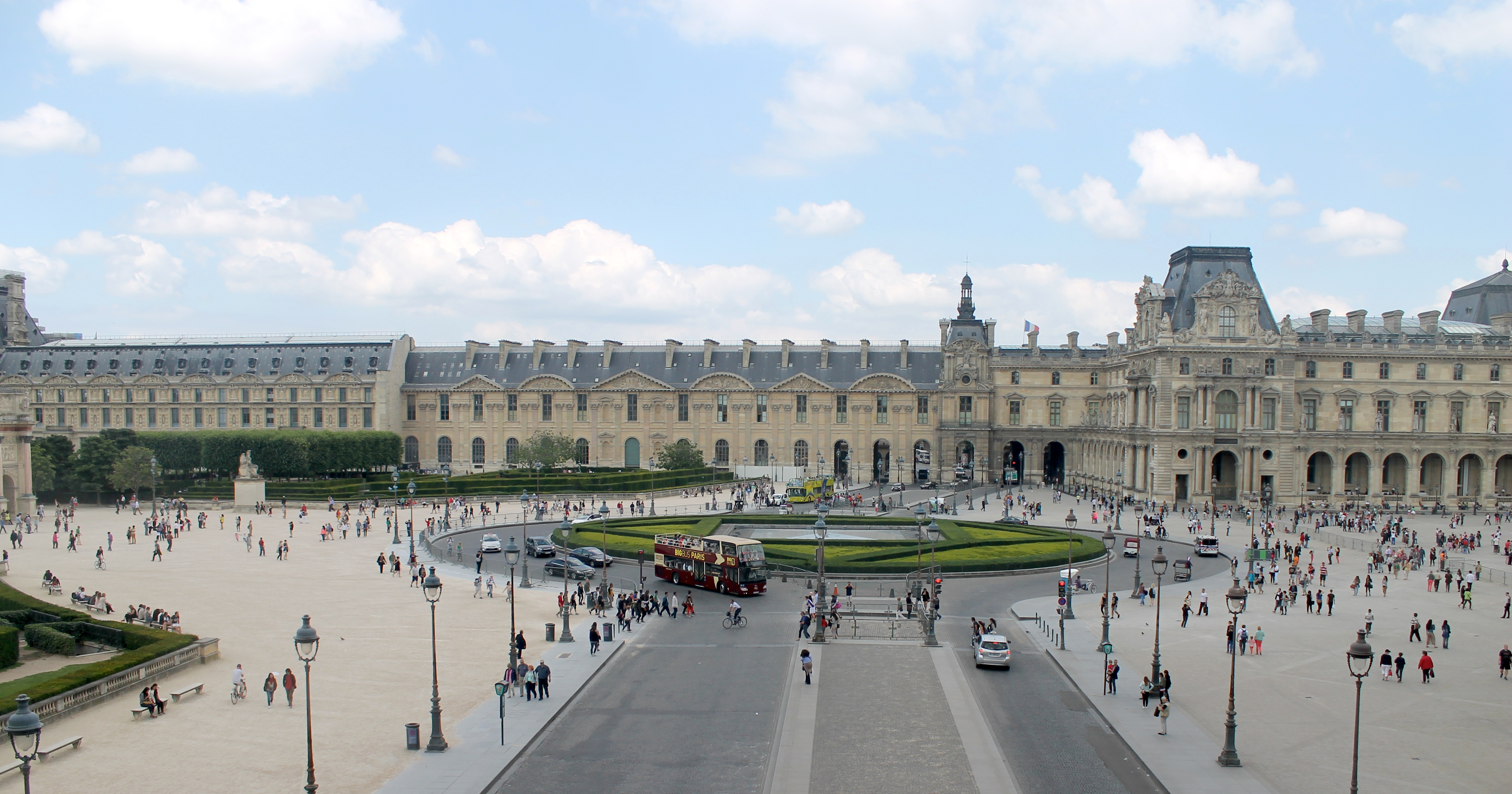
Place du Carrousel from the southern wing of the Louvre Palace. The Inverted Pyramid is at center and the Arc de Triomphe du Carrousel (partial view) is on the left

Outline plan of the Louvre Palace: the outline of the former Tuileries Palace (in white), on the left, with the Jardins du Carrousel of the Tuileries

The Place du Carrousel (French pronunciation: [plas dy kaʁuzɛl]) is a public square in the 1st arrondissement of Paris, located at the open end of the courtyard of the Louvre Palace, a space occupied, prior to 1883, by the courtyard of the Tuileries Palace (Cour du Carrousel). Sitting directly between the museum and the Tuileries Garden, the Place du Carrousel delineates the eastern end of the gardens just as the Place de la Concorde defines its western end.

The name "carrousel" refers to a type of military dressage, an equine demonstration now commonly called military drill. The Cour du Carrousel was named in 1662, when it was used for such a display by Louis XIV.

== History ==
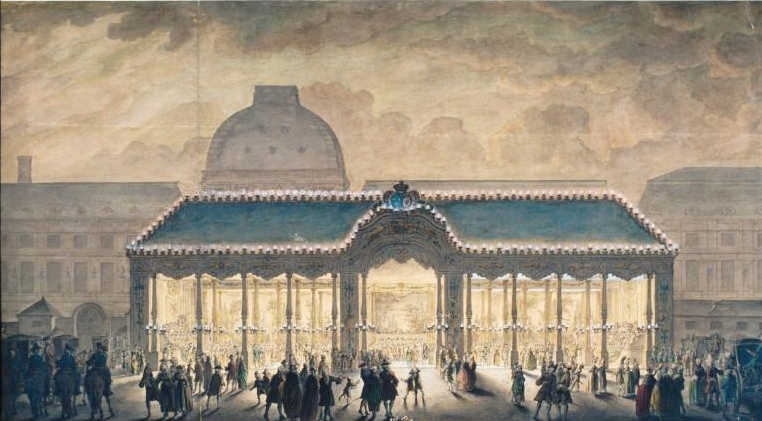
A construction in the Place du Carrousel at the time, in 1745, of the marriage of Louis, Dauphin of France. Note the Tuileries Palace in the background.

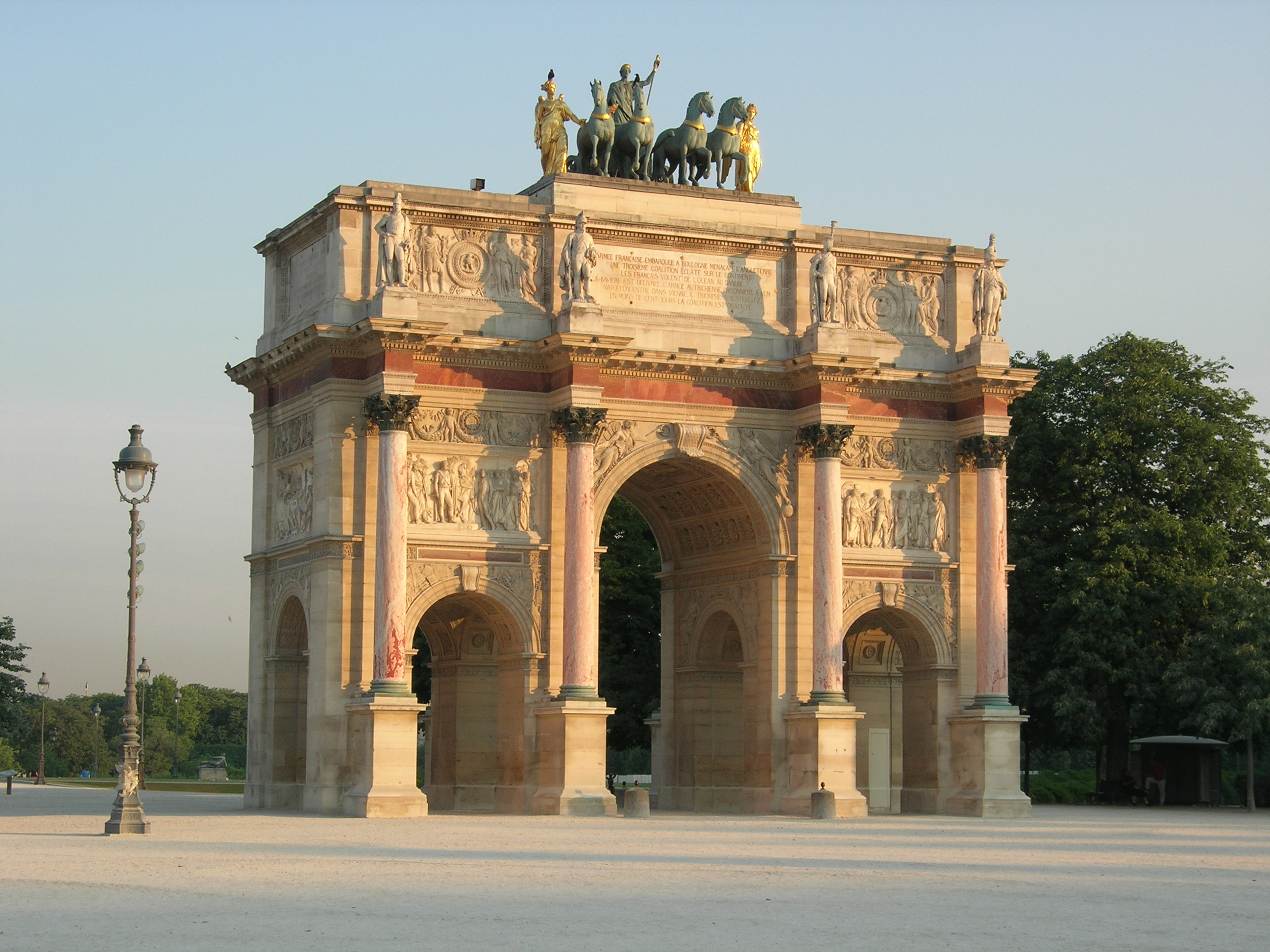
The Arc de Triomphe du Carrousel.

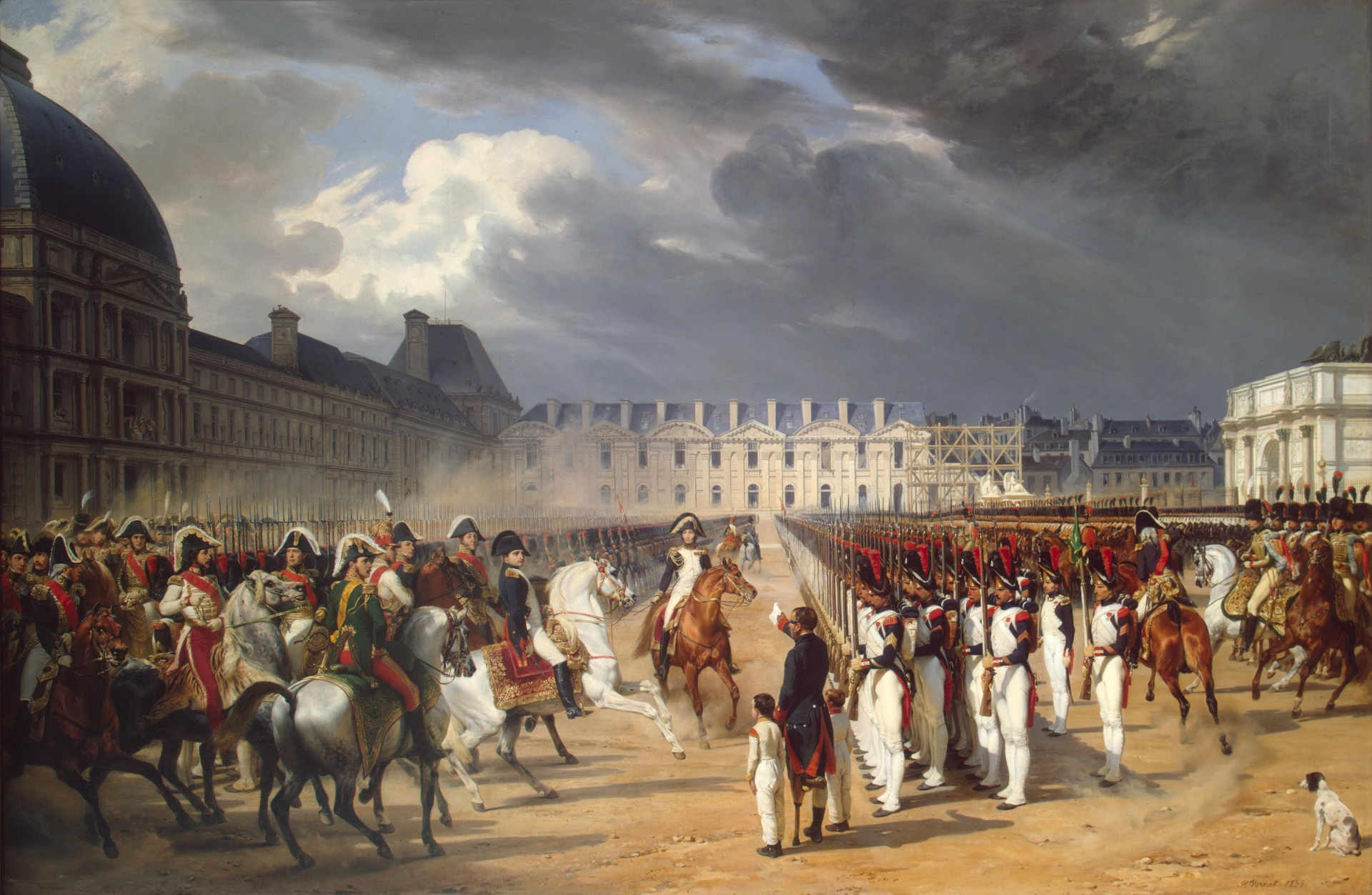
Napoleon at the Tuileries by Horace Vernet, 1838. The arch is at right, and the Tuileries Palace, since demolished, at left.

On 5 October 1789, a mob from Paris descended upon Versailles and forced the royal family — Louis XVI, Marie Antoinette, and their children, along with the Count of Provence (later King Louis XVIII), his wife Marie Joséphine of Savoy, and Madame Elisabeth, the youngest sister of the King — to move to Paris under the watchful eye of the National Guard. The King and Queen were installed in the Tuileries Palace under surveillance. During this time, there were many plots designed to help members of the royal family escape from France. The Queen rejected several because she would not leave without the King. Other opportunities to rescue the family were ultimately frittered away by the indecisive king. After many delays, an escape was eventually attempted on 21 June 1791, but failed when the entire family was captured twenty-four hours later at Varennes and taken back to Paris within a week.

On 20 June 1792, "a mob of terrifying aspect" broke into the Tuileries and made the King wear the red Phrygian cap to show his loyalty to the revolution.

The vulnerability of the King was exposed on 10 August of that year when an armed mob, on the verge of forcing its way into the Tuileries Palace, forced the King and the royal family to seek refuge at the Legislative Assembly. An hour and a half later, the palace was invaded by the mob. They massacred the Swiss Guards, who fought with dedication and desperation. Some seven hundred were killed, and their bloodied bodies decorated the yard in front of the palace (in the place then known as the Cours du Carrousel), in the gardens of the palace, and along the banks of the Seine. On 13 August, the royal family was imprisoned in the tower of the Temple in the Le Marais district, under conditions considerably harsher than their previous confinement in the Tuileries.

On 21 August 1792, the guillotine was erected in the Place du Carrousel, and it remained there, with two short interruptions, until 11 May 1793. In total, thirty-five people were guillotined there.

On 2 August 1793, at the former site of the guillotine, a wooden pyramid was constructed as a tribute to Jean-Paul Marat. It bore an inscription: "To the spirit of the late Marat, 13 July, year I. From his underground tomb, he still makes the traitors tremble. A treacherous hand thwarted the affections of the people." There was also an exhibit of the famous hip bath of Marat and his desk where some of his most impassioned polemics were drafted. These items stayed in place until 9 Thermidor Year II (28 July 1794).

During the revolution of 1848, the Tuileries Palace was looted and severely damaged by rioters. On 23 May 23, 1871, during the suppression of the Paris Commune, twelve men under the orders of a Communard, Dardelle, set the Tuileries on fire at seven in the evening, using petroleum, liquid tar, and turpentine. The fire lasted for forty-eight hours and entirely consumed the palace. The ruins of the Tuileries stood on the site for eleven years. In 1882, the French National Assembly voted for the demolition of the ruins, and, despite much contrary sentiment, this was accomplished in 1883. The salvageable remains of the building were sold to a private entrepreneur.

Once the palace had been cleared away, the ground, which had been known as the Cour du Carrousel since 1662, could, once again, be used as a public square.

== The Arc de Triomphe du Carrousel ==
With the disappearance of the palace, the Arc de Triomphe du Carrousel, built between 1806 and 1808 to serve as an entrance of honor at the Tuileries, became the dominant feature of the Place du Carrousel. It is a triumphal arch that was commissioned in 1806 to commemorate Napoleon's military victories of the previous year. The more famous Arc de Triomphe de l'Étoile nearby was designed in the same year, but it took thirty years to build, and it is about twice as massive.

== People guillotined in the Place du Carrousel ==
- Arnaud II de la Porte, minister
- Jacques Cazotte, writer

== Transportation ==
This site is served by the metro station named Palais Royal - Musée du Louvre.

== See also ==
- Pont du Carrousel
- Tuileries Palace
