= Ian Ritchie =

Ian Ritchie may refer to:

- Ian Ritchie (producer), composer, producer, arranger and saxophonist
- Ian Ritchie (architect) (born 1947), British architect
  - Ian Ritchie Architects, his company
- Ian Ritchie (entrepreneur), Scottish businessman
- Ian Ritchie (baseball) (born 2003), American baseball player
