= Peter Rice (structural engineer) =

Irish structural engineer (1935–1992)

Peter Ronan Rice MRIAI HonFRIBA MICE
- Born: 16 June 1935; Dublin, Ireland
- Died: 25 October 1992 (aged 57); London, England
- Education: Queen's University of Belfast; Imperial College London
- Spouse: Sylvia Watson
- Children: Julia Rudin, Heidi Jarossi, Kieran Rice, Nemone Routh
- Engineering career
- Discipline: Structural engineer, Engineering design
- Institutions: Fellow of the Institution of Structural Engineers; Member of the Institution of Civil Engineers; Fellow of the Royal Academy of Engineering; Member of the Royal Institute of the Architects of Ireland; Honorary Fellow of the Royal Institute of British Architects
- Practice name: Ove Arup & Partners
- Projects: Sydney Opera House; Centre Pompidou; Lloyd's of London; Louvre Pyramid; Stansted Airport; Kansai International Airport
- Awards: RIBA Gold Medal; IStructE Gold Medal

Peter Rice (Peter Ronan Rice, 16 June 1935 – 25 October 1992) was an Irish structural engineer.

Born in Dublin, he grew up in 52 Castle Road, Dundalk in County Louth, and spent his childhood between the town of Dundalk, and the villages of Gyles' Quay and Inniskeen. He was educated at Queen's University of Belfast where he received his primary degree and spent a year at Imperial College London. Rice acted as Structural Engineer on three of the most important architectural works of the 20th century: the Sydney Opera House (with Ove Arup), Pompidou Centre and the Lloyd's Building and was renowned for his innate ability to act as both engineer and designer.

He originally studied Aeronautical Engineering but switched to Civil Engineering. Taken on by Ove Arup & Partners, his first job was the roof of the Sydney Opera House. He married Sylvia Watson in 1960 and they had one son (who became an engineer) and three daughters.

Jonathan Glancey in his obituary said "Rice was, perhaps, the James Joyce of structural engineering. His poetic invention, his ability to turn accepted ideas on their head and his rigorous mathematical and philosophical logic made him one of the most sought-after engineers of our times".

== Philosophy ==
He believed the best buildings result from the symbiotic relationship between the architect and the engineer where the engineer is the objective inventor and the architect the creative input. He found the Anglo-Saxon understanding of the work of an engineer restrictive and preferred the French and Italian interpretation of the role.

== Work ==
Among the notable buildings on whose design he worked are the Centre Pompidou, the Sydney Opera House, Lloyd's of London, the Louvre Pyramid, the Mound Stand at Lord's Cricket Ground, Kansai International Airport and Stansted Airport. Towards the end of his life he was largely responsible for the new façade of Lille Cathedral.

== Career ==
=== Sydney Opera House ===
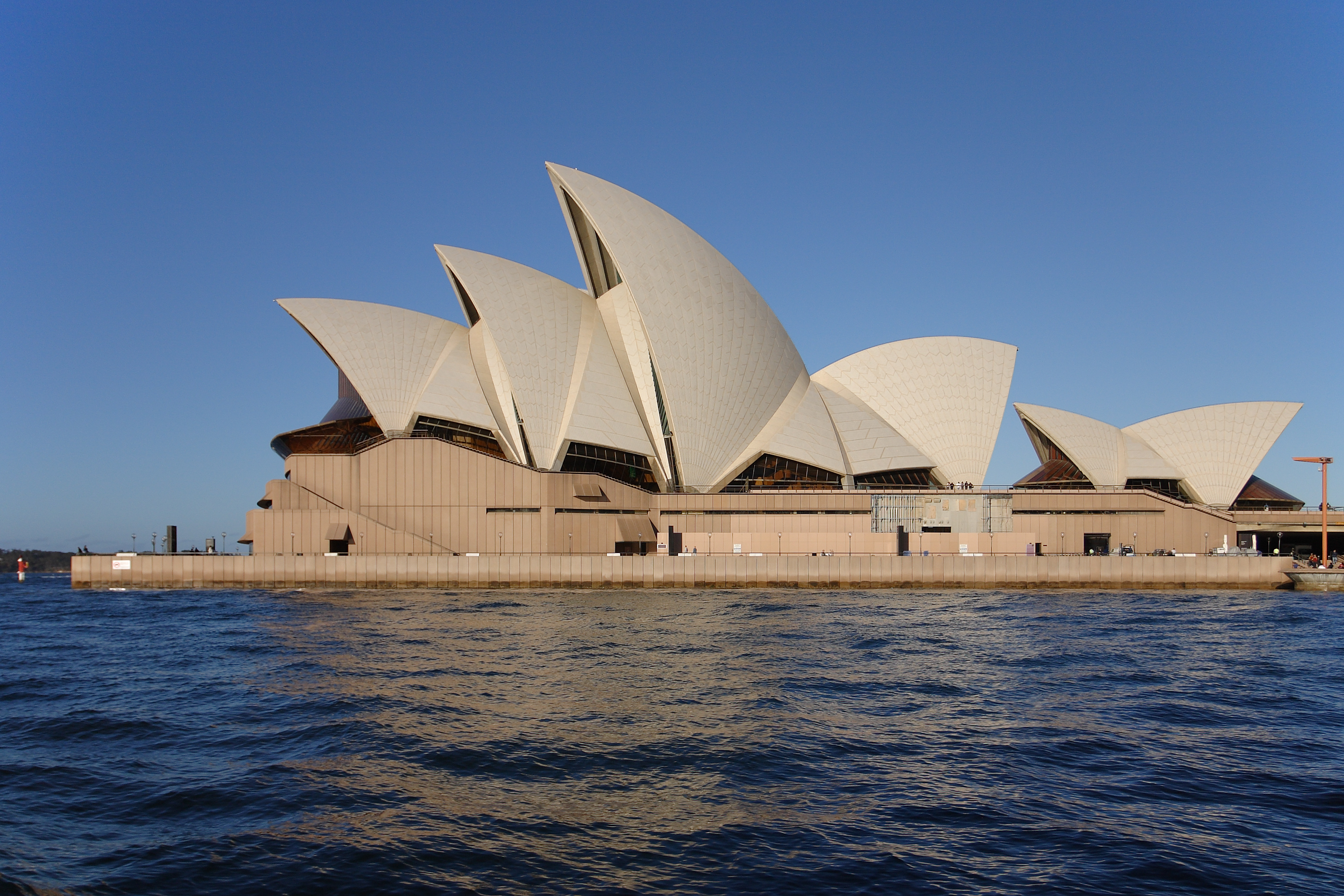
Sydney Opera House, completed in 1973 and made UNESCO World Heritage Site in 2009.

In 1956, he joined Ove Arup & Partners. In 1957, he took leave to pursue post-graduate studies at Imperial College, rejoining Arup in 1958. After three years working on Jørn Utzon shells for the roof of the Sydney Opera House in London, where he is credited with having done the geometry for the challenging design, he moved to Sydney to be an assistant engineer to Ian MacKenzie. After one month MacKenzie fell ill and was hospitalised, leaving Rice in total charge at the age of 28. On-site his geometrical knowledge enabled him to write a computer program to locate the segments of the shells correctly. In total he spent seven years working on the project. Afterwards, he spent 18 months in the United States, in New York City and as a visiting scholar at Cornell University.

=== Pompidou Centre (Beaubourg) ===
Front facade of the Pompidou Centre (Beaubourg) in the 4th arrondissement of Paris

In 1971, he was part of the winning team competing in the French government's competition for the centre of Paris at Beaubourg, partnering with Richard Rogers and Renzo Piano. Edmund Happold was the senior Arup engineer for the competition. Rice became the engineer for the built project which was greatly modified from the initial design. Art and technology were intertwined in the design enabling him to experiment with materials. He brought the concepts of humanity, tactility and scale to the project. His team developed the gerberette which enabled the counterbalancing of the weight of the building with light tubing, lightening the external appearance. He specified that these were to be made in cast steel.

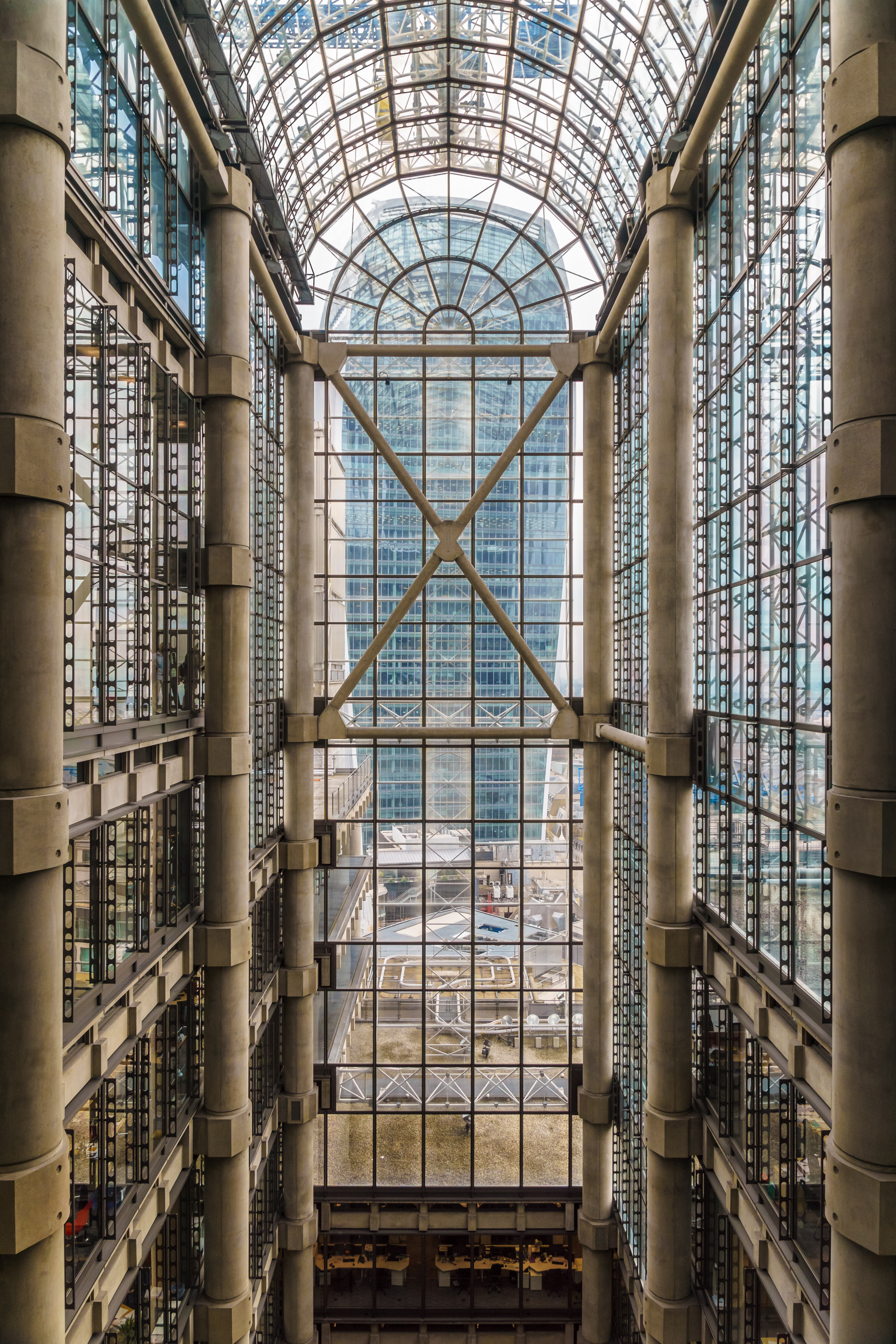
Lloyd's Building, Grade I listed and recognised as "one of the key buildings of the modern epoch".

After the Pompidou Centre, Rice set up his own company in 1977—"RFR"—along with Martin Francis and Ian Ritchie although he continued with Arup as a partner. In 1978 he was involved with Rogers again, this time on Lloyd's of London, completed in 1984. During this time his other projects encompassed the Fleetguard Factory at Quimper in France, and Stansted Airport in London.

=== 1980s and 1990s ===
Although Rice was based in London, where he worked with Michael Hopkins on the tented Mound Stand at Lord's, much of his work was in Paris, including the great glass walls of the Cité des Sciences at La Villette and the tent-like canopy that softens the monumentality of the Grand Arche at La Défense. In 1985 I. M. Pei asked his help with projects at the Louvre in Paris, namely the shell structures for the glass roofs that Pei planned to cover inner courtyards.

By then he was in great demand continuing to work with architects such as Richard Rogers, I. M. Pei, Norman Foster, Ian Ritchie, Kenzo Tange, Paul Andreu, and Renzo Piano. The projects he worked on ranged from Toronto's unbuilt Opera House by Moshe Safdie to Kansai's International Airport, one of many projects with the Renzo Piano Building Workshop.

He was known for his sympathetic attitude to design, his strategic approach, a cool head and managing to realise ambitious artistic designs in concrete reality. One of his marks as an engineer was the length of time he allowed to complete a project.

During his relatively short career, Rice's contribution to the built environment can be seen in the work of the Pritzker Prize winners, including I. M. Pei, Kenzō Tange, Jørn Utzon, Frei Otto, Richard Rogers, Norman Foster, Renzo Piano, and Zaha Hadid.

=== Innovative techniques ===
- During the Sydney Opera House project, was among the first to use advanced computer modelling.
- One of the key advances in building the Sydney Opera House was the use of post-tensioned concrete to reinforce the components of the shells.
- In his design for the Seville Expo '92, Rice used post-tensioned stone to construct the arcade.

== Awards ==
Peter Rice was made an honorary Fellow of the Royal Institute of British Architects (HonFRIBA) in 1988. In 1992, he was the second engineer to be awarded the Royal Gold Medal for Architecture by the Royal Institute of British Architects (the first was Ove Arup), and the second Irishman after Michael Scott. The award is conferred by the Sovereign annually for work that has "promoted, either directly or indirectly, the advancement of architecture".

== Death ==
He was diagnosed with a brain tumour in 1991 and died the following year aged 57. A sign has been put up outside his childhood home, 52 Castle Road, Dundalk, County Louth, saying "Birthplace of Peter Rice, Engineer, 1935–1992". The plaque was erected privately by the (then) Dundalk Town Architect, Paul Clancy.

== Legacy ==
Peter Rice has been influential in the development of building technology; he thus contributed to extend architectural engineering as a professional field. Rice has intricately tied the disciplines of structural engineering and architectural technology. Among Rice's major achievements are his contribution to the development of structural glazing and the optimisation of tensile structures using steel, glass and wood. Through his mathematical insight, Rice refined the engineering methods applied to slender, lightweight structures.

Rice's book, An Engineer Imagines, was posthumously published and came to be considered an important work in the history of building design. The Peter Rice Prize was established at the Harvard University Graduate School of Design (GSD) in 1994 in recognition of the ideals and principles represented by the late eminent engineer. The Peter R. Rice Scholarship Fund at the GSD, established in 2000 in Peter's memory, also provides fellowships to support students at the school from Ireland. The Peter Rice Silver Medal competition was established at Dundalk Institute of Technology (his home town) in 1996 under the patronage of Ove Arup and Engineers Ireland (Institution of Engineers of Ireland). This medal is awarded annually, to the best presentation by an engineering student of the institute on their practical project activity. In 2019, a documentary by Marcus Robinson, An Engineer Imagines, was screened by Channel 4 and in cinemas.

In 2012-2013, to celebrate Rice's 20-year anniversary, Arup organised the exhibition Traces of Peter Rice with a documentary.

In 2023 on the 50th anniversary of the opening of the Sydney Opera House, the Irish postal service, A Post, issued a stamp to mark the contribution of Rice to its opening. David McRedmond, the Chief Executive of the Irish Post said, "Ireland has been slow to recognise its contribution to Modernism. The 50th anniversary of Sydney Opera House is the perfect time to celebrate the role of Irish people, and of engineer Peter Rice in particular, to the great canon of world-class architecture and engineering."

== Bibliography ==
- An Engineer Imagines, Peter Rice (Artemis, 1994; Ellipsis Press, 1996)
- Structural Glass, Hugh Dutton, Peter Rice (Routledge; 2001)
- Transparente Architektur, Glasfassaden mit Structural Glazing, by H. Dutton, P. Rice (Birkhäuser Verlag; 1995)
- Yutaka Saito in: Space design, 8/1992,335 by Y. Saito, O. Murai, K. Nanba, M. Ueda, P. Rice, T. Shinoda (p. 5 – 188)
- Building a show: The Bastille Dances, by Station House Opera in: The Architects' Journal, 6/1989, by P. Rice (p. 72–73) – performance review
- Design for better assembly, case study: Rogers' and Arup's in: The Architects' Journal, 36/1984, by J. Young, P. Rice, J. Thornton (p. 87–94)
- Menil Collection Museum roof: evolving the form in: Arup journal, 2/1987, by P. Rice (p. 2–5)
- Rogers revolution: Lloyd's remarkable new headquarters in: Building Design, 1986,807, by P. Rice (p. 32–33)
- Il punto di vista di Peter Rice | An engineer's view in: L'Arca, 1987,5, by P. Rice (p. 70–75)
- Unstable structures in: Columbia documents of architecture and theory, 1992, by P. Rice (p. 71–89)
- Stratégie de l'araignée in: L'architecture d'aujourd'hui, 1987,252, by P. Rice (p. 78–79)
- Menil Collection museum roof: evolving the form in: Offramp, 1991,4 by P. Rice (p. 117–119)
- Gleichgewicht und Spannung | Equilibre et tension in: Archithese, 2/1990, by P. Rice (p. 84–96)
- Konstruktive Intelligenz in: arch+: Rhetorik des Machens, 1990,102, by G. Behnisch, C. Vasconi, O. Aicher, J. Nouvel, H. C. Schulitz, P. Rice, R. Rogers, S. Polónyi, H. von Malotki (p. 42–52)
- Peter Rice: Performing Instability, 2015, by Dr Greg Kerr, Enlighten Publications, University of Glasgow
- Traces of Peter Rice, Kevin Barry (ed) (Lilliput Press, 2017)

== Projects ==
Canopy "Le Nuage" at La Défense in Nanterre, situated under the Grande Arche

- Sydney Opera House, Sydney, Australia; 1957
- Crucible Theatre, Sheffield, England; 1967
- Amberly Road Children's Home, London, England; 1969
- National Sports Centre, Crystal Palace, London, England; 1970
- Arts Centre, University of Warwick, Coventry, England; 1970
- Perspex spiral staircase, Andrew Grima jewellery shop, 80 Jermyn Street, London, England; 1970

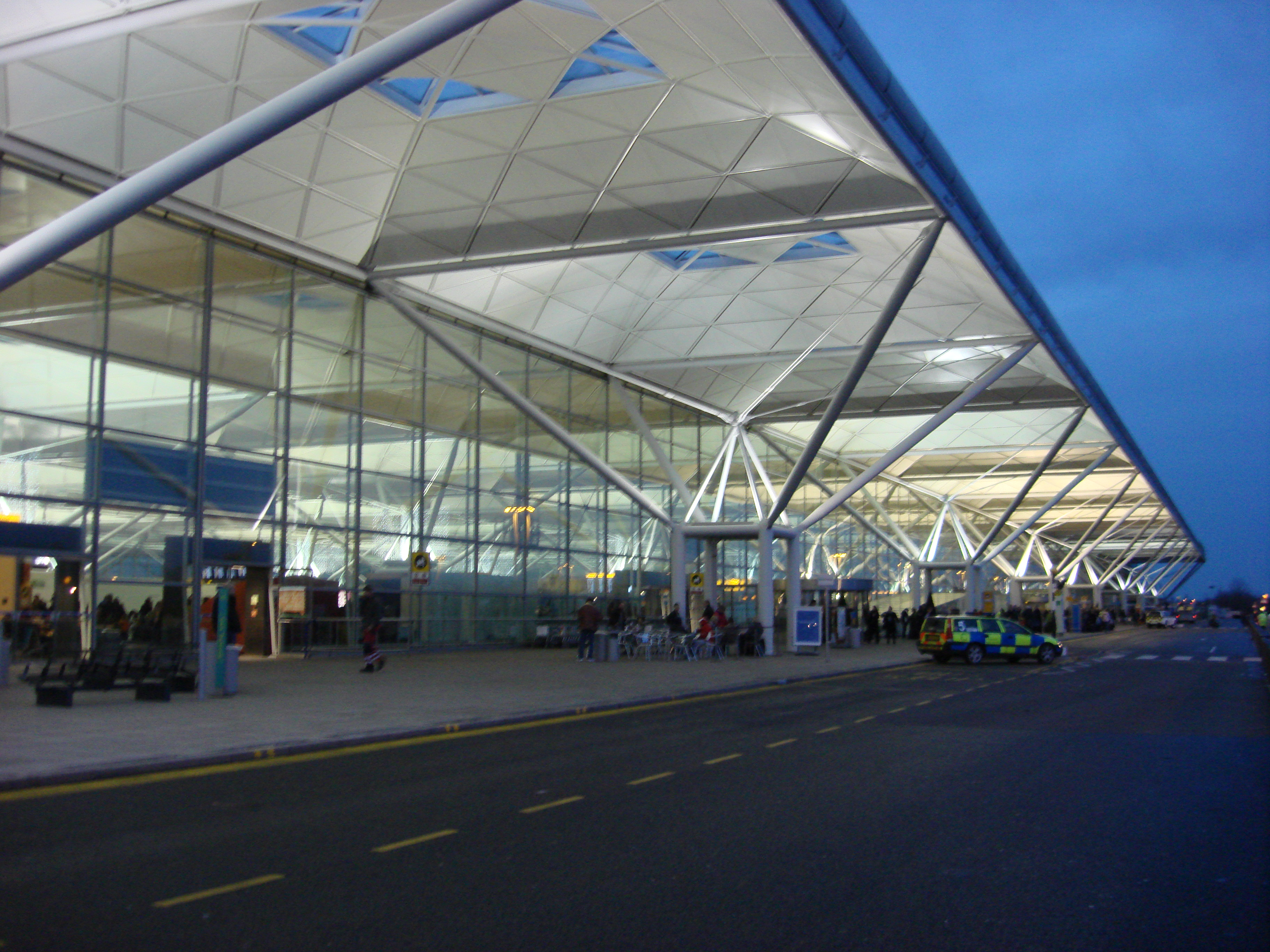
London Stansted Airport

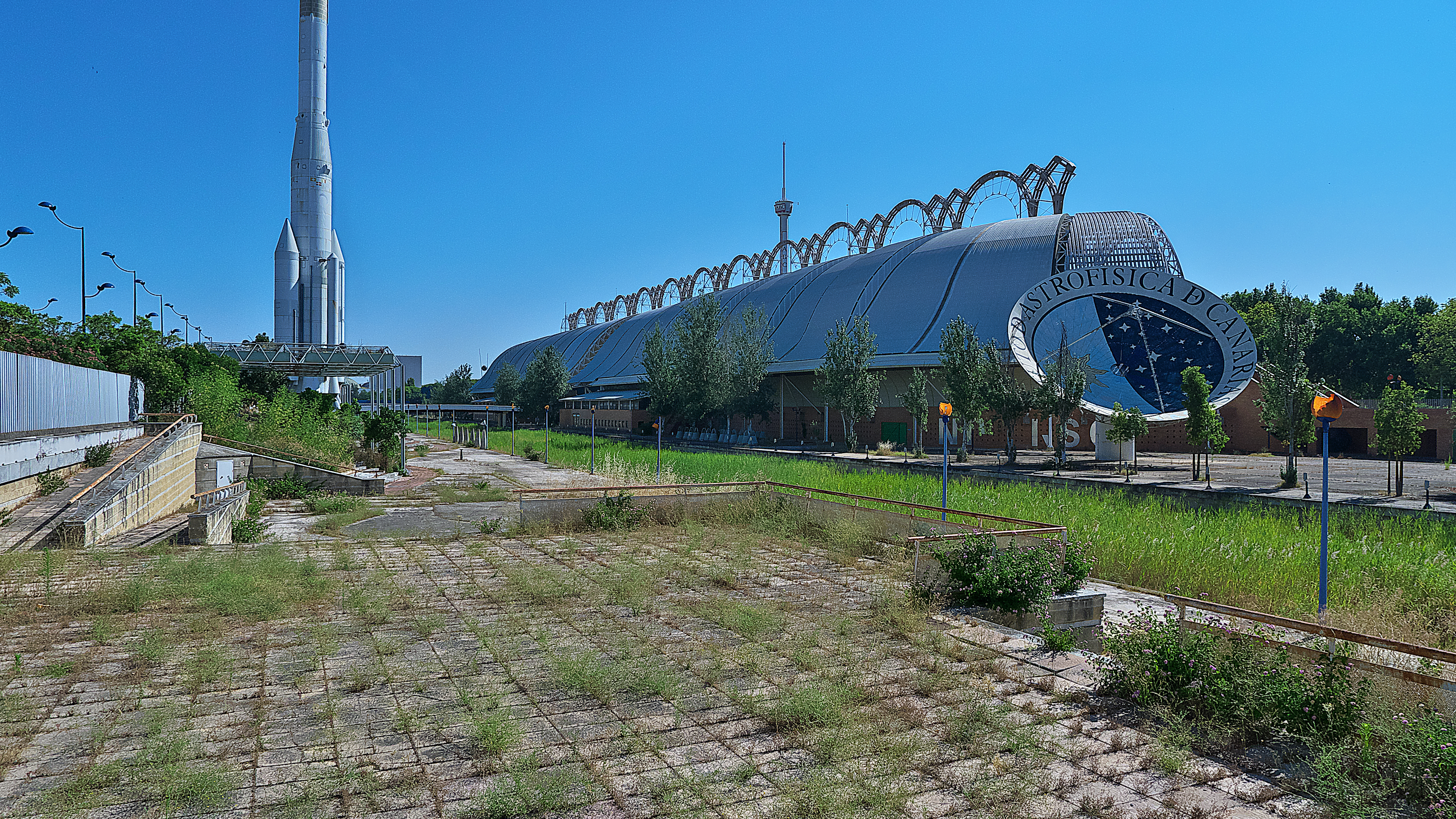
Expo 1992. Pavilion of Future

- Super Grimentz Ski Village, Valais, Switzerland; 1970
- Conference Centre, Mecca, Saudi Arabia; 1971
- Special structures advice to Frei Otto and others on pneumatic and cable structures including "The City in the Arctic"; 1971
- Centre Pompidou (Beaubourg), Paris-4^{ième}, France; 1971
- Jumbo jet hangar, Johannesburg, South Africa; 1976
- Residential complex in Corciano, Italy; 1978–82
- Lloyd's building, London; 1978-86
- "Quartierslaboratorium" für Stadterneuerung Otranto, Italy; 1979
- IBM Traveling Pavillon; 1980–84
- Menil Collection, Houston; 1981–86
- Cité des Sciences et de l'Industrie Paris-19^{ième}, France; 1986
- Louvre Pyramid, Paris-1^{er}, France; 1988–93
- London Stansted Airport; 1988-91
- Canopy "Le Nuage" at La Défense, Nanterre, France; 1986–89
- Roof of the postal coach station in Chur, Switzerland; 1989–92
- The Bigo cable-stayed steel structure, Italy; 1990-92
- The Full Moon Theatre; Gourgoubès, France; 1991–92
- Pabellón del Futuro; Seville, Spain; 1991–92
- Japan Bridge (passerelle Kupka) at La Défense, Nanterre, France; 1990–93; project completed posthumously by collaborating engineers Kate Purver, Lionel Pennison and Pat Dallard and by collaborating architectural technologist Hugh Dutton
- Elektronikfabrik Thomson Saint-Quentin-en-Yvelines, France; 1990
- West facade of Lille cathedral, France; 1991–99; project completed posthumously
- TGV Station Roissy, France; 1991–94
- Mobiles Zelt in London, England; 1992
- TGV Station Lille, France; 1994
