= Ian Ritchie Architects =

British architectural and design practice

Ritchie Studio, formerly known as Ian Ritchie Architects, is a British architectural and design practice, based in London led by its founder Ian Ritchie. Recently completed projects include the RIBA Award-winning Susie Sainsbury Theatre, the Angela Burgess Recital Hall for the Royal Academy of Music, and the Sainsbury Wellcome Centre for Neural Circuits and Behaviour, University College London.

Previous works of note include Stratford-upon-Avon's Royal Shakespeare Company Courtyard Theatre, the Leipzig Trade Fair Messe Glass Hall, Europe's largest single volume glass building, the Spire of Dublin, the Terrasson Greenhouse for the Gardens of the Imagination in Terrasson-Lavilledieu, and the London Regatta Centre.

== History ==
Ian Ritchie CBE RA founded Ian Ritchie Architects in 1981. It has twice been shortlisted for the European Mies van der Rohe Award and on four occasions for the RIBA Stirling Prize: for the Crystal Palace Park Concert Platform (1998), the TR2 Production Centre at the Theatre Royal, Plymouth (2003), the Spire of Dublin (2004) and the RSC Courtyard Theatre (2007). The Susie Sainsbury Theatre and Angela Burgess Recital Hall at the Royal Academy of Music was the RIBA London Region Building of the Year 2018. The project received 17 major national and 4 international awards and was nominated for the EU Mies van der Rohe Award.

Other awards include Premio Internazionale Ischia di Architettura Innovation Prize; the Iritecna Prize for Europe; Eric Lyons Memorial Award for European Housing; Commonwealth Association of Architects Robert Matthew Award for Innovation and the Advancement of Architecture; IABSE (International Association for Bridge and Structural Engineering) Outstanding Structure Award for the Leipzig Glass Hall; and UK Design Council Millennium Product Awards for the 'f' EDF VHV transmission towers and Crystal Palace Park Concert Platform. In the UK the practice's work has been exhibited at the ICA, Tate Gallery, Royal Academy of Arts and the RIBA. Internationally it has been shown in Tokyo, New York, São Paulo, Moscow, Vienna, Frankfurt, Berlin, Copenhagen, and the Paris and Venice Biennales.

== Notable works ==
=== United Kingdom ===
- Royal Academy of Music: The Susie Sainsbury Theatre and The Angela Burgess Recital Hall
- London School of Hygiene and Tropical Medicine
- Sussex House, Covent Garden, London
- Mercer Walk, Covent Garden, London
- Sainsbury Wellcome Centre for Neural Circuits and Behaviour, University College London
- Royal Shakespeare Company: The Other Place
- Wood Lane Underground Station
- Westfield London (White City)
- Royal Shakespeare Company: Courtyard Theatre
- Plymouth Theatre Royal Production Centre
- Scotland's Home of Tomorrow, Glasgow
- London Regatta Centre
- Bermondsey Underground Station
- Crystal Palace Park Concert Platform
- Stockley Park Offices
- Roy Square – The Watergarden
- Eagle Rock House, East Sussex

=== Europe ===
- Spire of Dublin
- EDF transmission towers (400kV), France
- Leipzig Trade Fair Messe Glass Hall, Germany (with gmp)
- Terrasson Cultural Greenhouse, France
- The Louvre Sculpture Courts and Inverted Pyramid, Paris (with I.M Pei and RFR)
- Reina Sofia Museum of Modern Art, Madrid (with Onzono/Castro)
- Cité des Sciences et de l'Industrie, La Villette, Paris

== See also ==
Ian Ritchie (Architect)
