= Spire of Dublin =

Monument in Dublin, Ireland

Spire of Dublin Millennium Spire Monument of Light
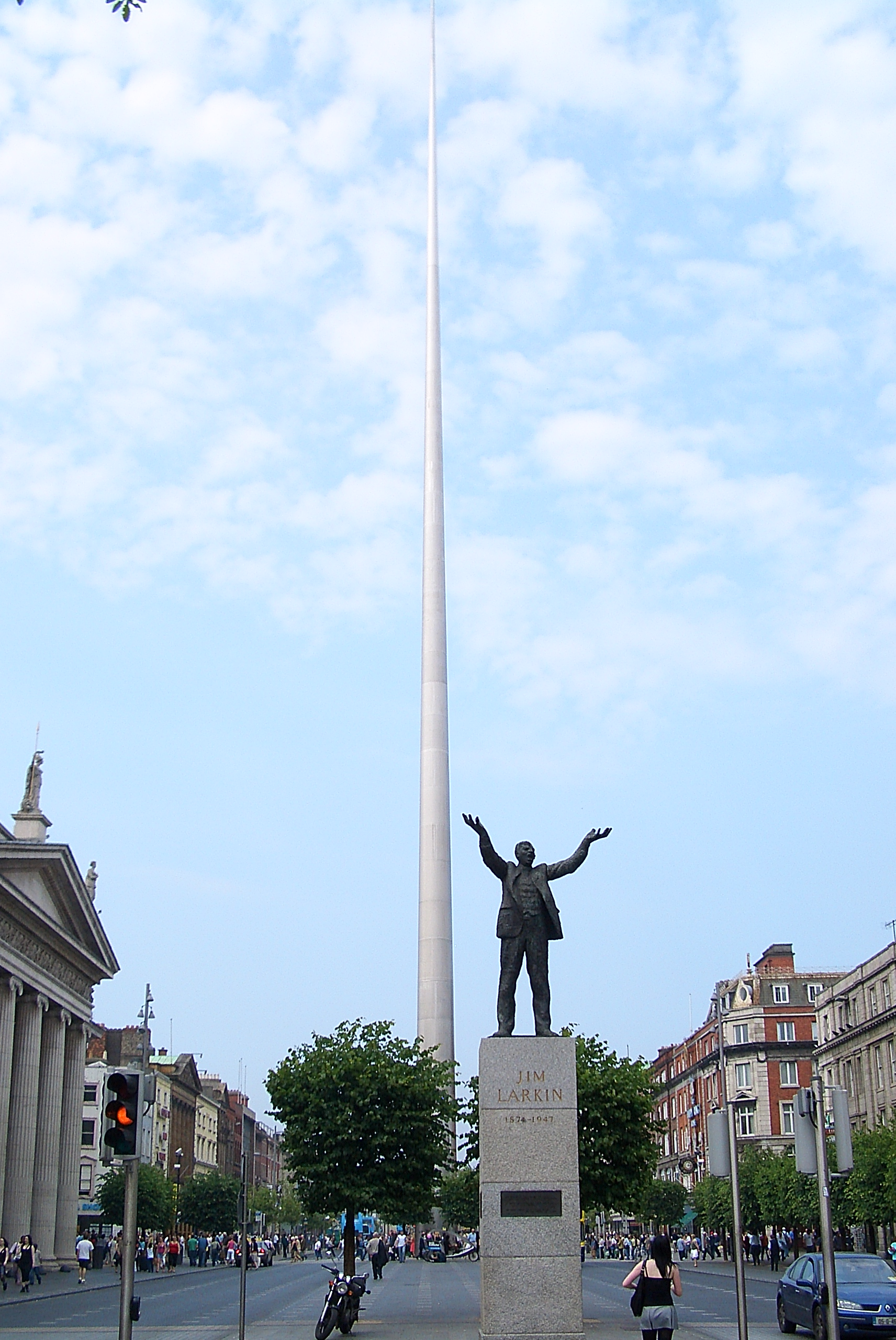
- Seen from O'Connell Street

General information
- Type: Monument, sculpture
- Location: Dublin, Ireland
- Coordinates: 53°20′59″N 6°15′37″W
- Construction started: 2002
- Completed: 21 January 2003 (23 years ago)
- Cost: €4,600,000
- Client: Dublin City Council

Height
- Antenna spire: 120 m (393.7 ft)

Technical details
- Material: Stainless steel

Design and construction
- Architect: Ian Ritchie Architects
- Engineer: Arup

The Spire of Dublin (Irish: Spuaic Bhaile Átha Cliath), alternatively titled the Millennium Spire, and the Monument of Light (Irish: An Túr Solais), is a large, stainless steel, pin-like monument 120 metres (390 ft) in height, located on the site of the former Nelson's Pillar (and prior to that a statue of William Blakeney) on O'Connell Street, the main thoroughfare of Dublin, Ireland.

== History ==
=== Nelson's Pillar ===
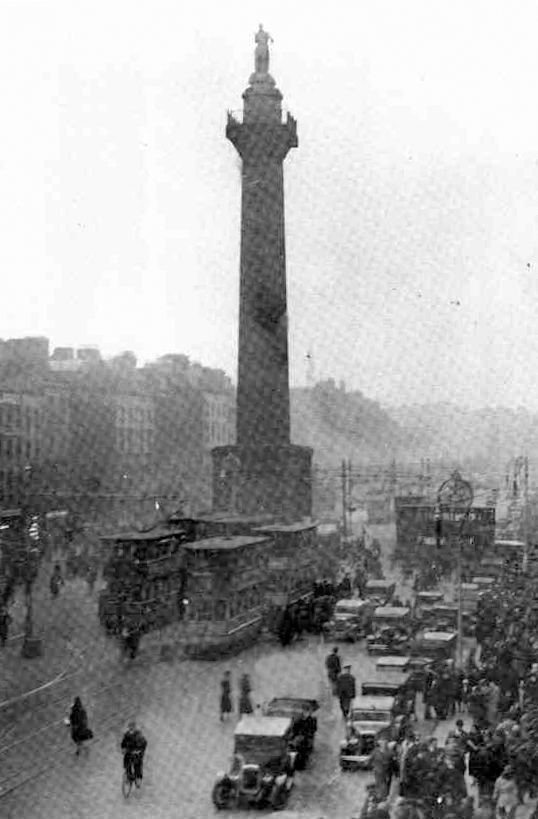
Nelson's Pillar stood on the site of the Spire until it was destroyed by a bomb in 1966.

Following the bombing of Nelson's Pillar by former IRA members in 1966, and subsequent controlled demolition six days later of what was left, the site remained vacant for years as no decision could be reached on a suitable replacement. Eventually, the Anna Livia monument was installed on the site to celebrate the 1988 Dublin Millennium celebrations.

=== Re-development of O'Connell Street ===
In 1998, as part of a planned multi-million euro re-development of O'Connell Street, a competition was launched to find a replacement for Nelson's Pillar.

As part of the project to improve the overall streetscape, a new granite plaza was promised and the number of trees in the central reservation, which had overgrown and obscured views and monuments, was reduced dramatically. This was controversial, as the trees had been growing for a century.

In the editorial for the Irish Arts Review Yearbook 1999, art historian Homan Potterton wrote of his reservations regarding the plan, opining:

The announcement of an international competition for a new monument for O'Connell Street, Dublin to replace the Pillar which was blown-up on Easter Monday 1966 makes one shudder: absolutely shudder. That is because ninety-nine percent of the public sculpture which was (sic) been erected in Ireland over the last decade or so – not least the Floosie in the Jacuzzi on O'Connell Street itself – is, quite simply, dire. While Dublin Corporation are to be congratulated for promoting such a competition as part of its renewal programme for the city's principal thoroughfare (the O'Connell Street Integrated Area Plan) and few people would doubt that an appropriate monument – a focus and a symbol – is badly needed, it is the thought of the symbol which might be inflicted upon us – at a projected cost of £4 million – that considerably dampens our enthusiasm.

On 14 June 2000, the city manager of Dublin Corporation, John Fitzgerald, noted that the project would be delayed by the required archaeological inspection of the site.

=== Competition and design ===
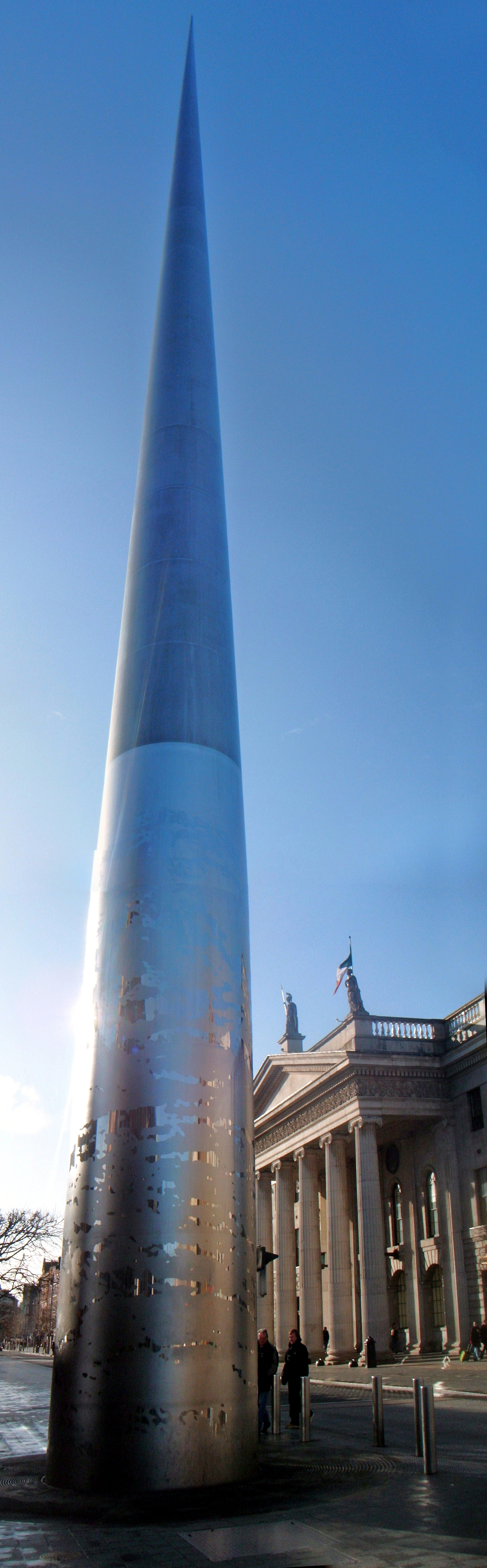
The Spire looking towards the Liffey

The Spire, or Spire of Light, was chosen from 205 submissions in an international open competition held in 1998 by a committee chaired by the Lord Mayor of Dublin, Joe Doyle. Following an appeal by an objector, the plans were taken to the High Court, meaning that the monument was ultimately not ready for the Millennium celebrations in the year 2000. The spire was designed by Ian Ritchie of Ian Ritchie Architects, who sought an "elegant and dynamic simplicity bridging art and technology".

On 28 December 2000, after the EIS had been carried out, Minister for Environment and Local Government Noel Dempsey announced that construction of the Monument of Light, or The Spike, had been approved and that construction of the monument would take nineteen months to complete. The announcement constituted a defeat for An Taisce, Ireland's non-governmental organisation active in the areas of the environment and built heritage, which had called for the monument's height to be reduced. Dempsey noted that Dublin Corporation had previously failed to complete an EIS in its haste to complete the monument quickly.

The contract to construct the monument was awarded to SIAC-Radley JV and it was manufactured by Radley Engineering of Dungarvan, County Waterford, and erected by SIAC Construction Ltd & GDW Engineering Ltd. The Anna Livia monument was eventually moved away to make room for the Spire in 2002.

=== Modern era ===
In December 2015, to coincide with the Irish premier of Star Wars: The Force Awakens, a large temporary lightsaber hilt was installed at the base of the Spire to light the Spire blue at night.

In May 2024, The Portal was opened. It created a visual bridge connecting Dublin and New York with a live videostream of The Spire shown to New Yorkers, while the portal in New York was broadcast from the Flatiron Building.

In September 2025, a large flag of Palestine appeared atop the spire, attached to a hoop. It is suspected that the flag was dropped by a drone. There have been no claims of responsibility, and the flag remains as of mid-2026, due to the difficulty and expense of removal.

== Construction ==
The first section was installed on 18 December 2002. Construction of the sculpture was delayed because of difficulty in obtaining planning permission and environmental regulations. The Spire consists of eight hollow stainless steel cone sections, the longest being 20 m (66 ft), which were installed on 21 January 2003. It is an elongated cone of diameter 3 m (9.8 ft) at the base, narrowing to 15 cm (5.9 in) at the top. The total weight of the eight sections amounts to 133.15 tonnes. It features two tuned mass dampers inside the fifth section from the bottom, designed by engineers Arup, to counteract sway. The steel underwent shot peening to alter the quality of light reflected from it.

The pattern around the base of the Spire is based on a core sample of rock formation taken from the ground where the spire stands and the DNA double helix. The pattern was applied by bead blasting the steel through rubber stencil masks whose patterns were created by water jet cutting based on core sample drawings supplied by the contractor. The design around the 10 m (33 ft) lower part of the Spire was created by the architects making a 3D pattern model combining the core sample and double helix and then digitally translated to a 2D image drawing supplied to the contractor and used by specialists for cutting the masking material.

At dusk, the base of the monument is lit and the top 10 m (33 ft) is illuminated through 11,884 holes through which light-emitting diodes shine.

== Reception ==
Some opposition initially greeted the monument. Supporters compare it to other initially unpopular urban structures such as the Eiffel Tower, while detractors complain that the Spire has little architectural or cultural connection to the city. Irish intellectual Desmond Fennell believed that the Spire symbolised Ireland's diminishing sense of nationhood, writing that "on reflection [on the Spire], I recognised that it was at least an honest statement of the Republic's state of mind after its prudent self-effacement during the Northern War and during the past-effacing enrichment of the Celtic Tiger boom. It stood for, represented, and said nothing."

Complaints were also aired about the danger posed by the monument to low-flying aircraft, as well as the absence of a Christian message. It has inspired a number of nicknames, as is common with public art in Dublin, including the stiletto in the ghetto, the pin in the bin, the stiffy by the Liffey, the spire in the mire, or the spike.

== Award nominations ==
The monument has been nominated for the following awards:

- 2003 British Construction Industry International Award finalist
- 2004 RIBA National Award & Stirling Prize shortlist
- 2005 Mies Van der Rohe Prize list

== Gallery ==
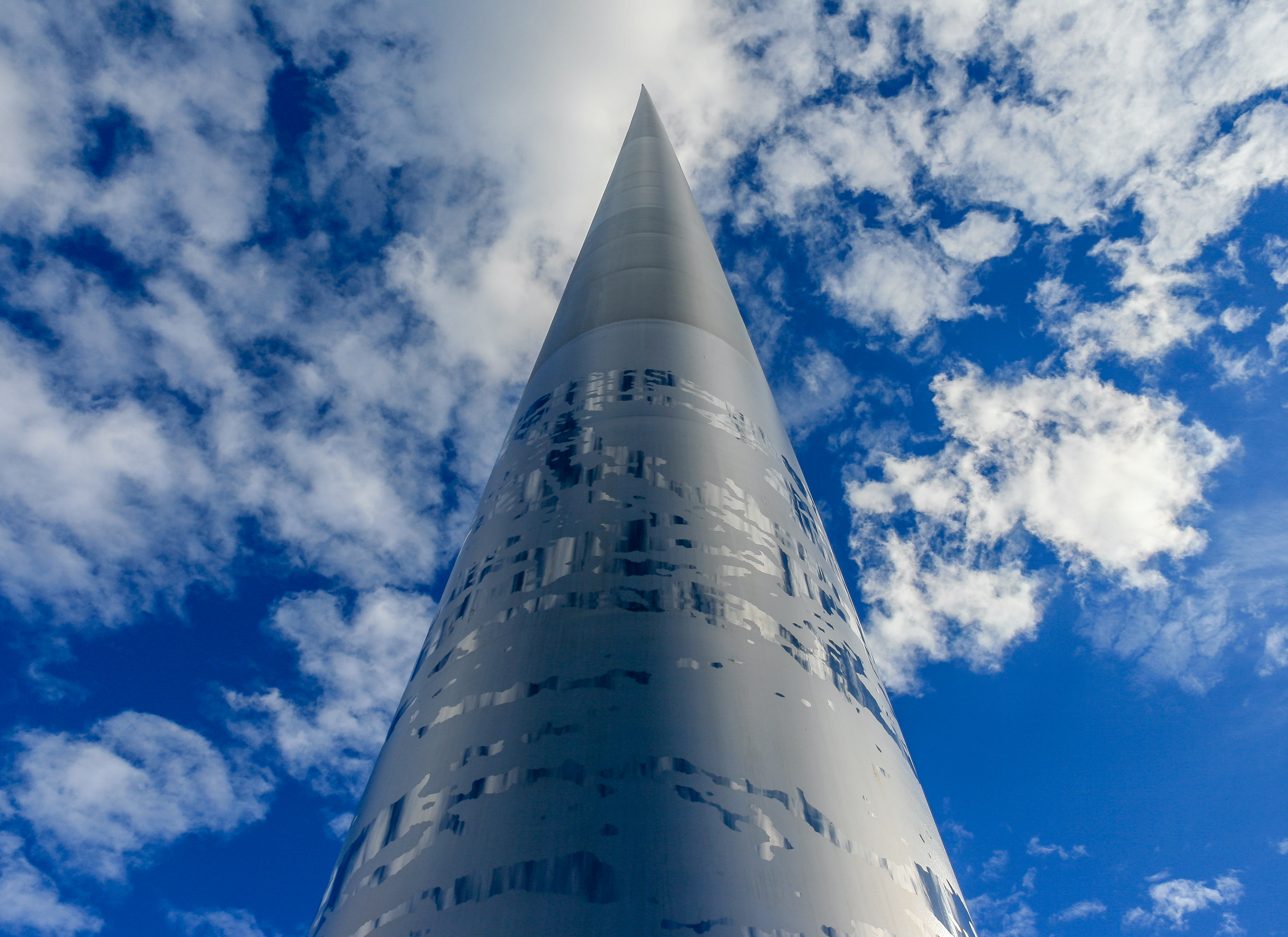
View from the bottom of the construction

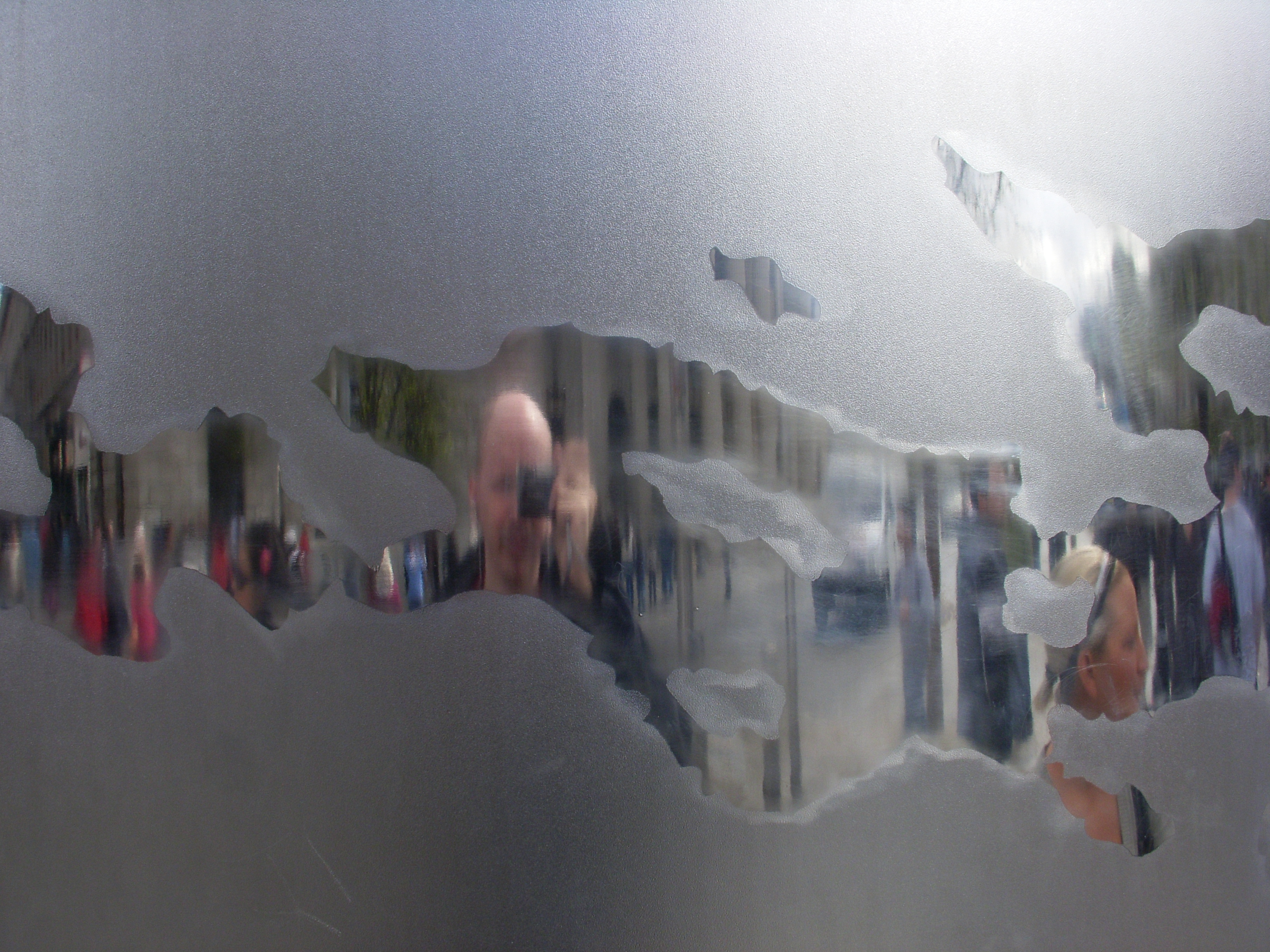
Detail of the base artwork

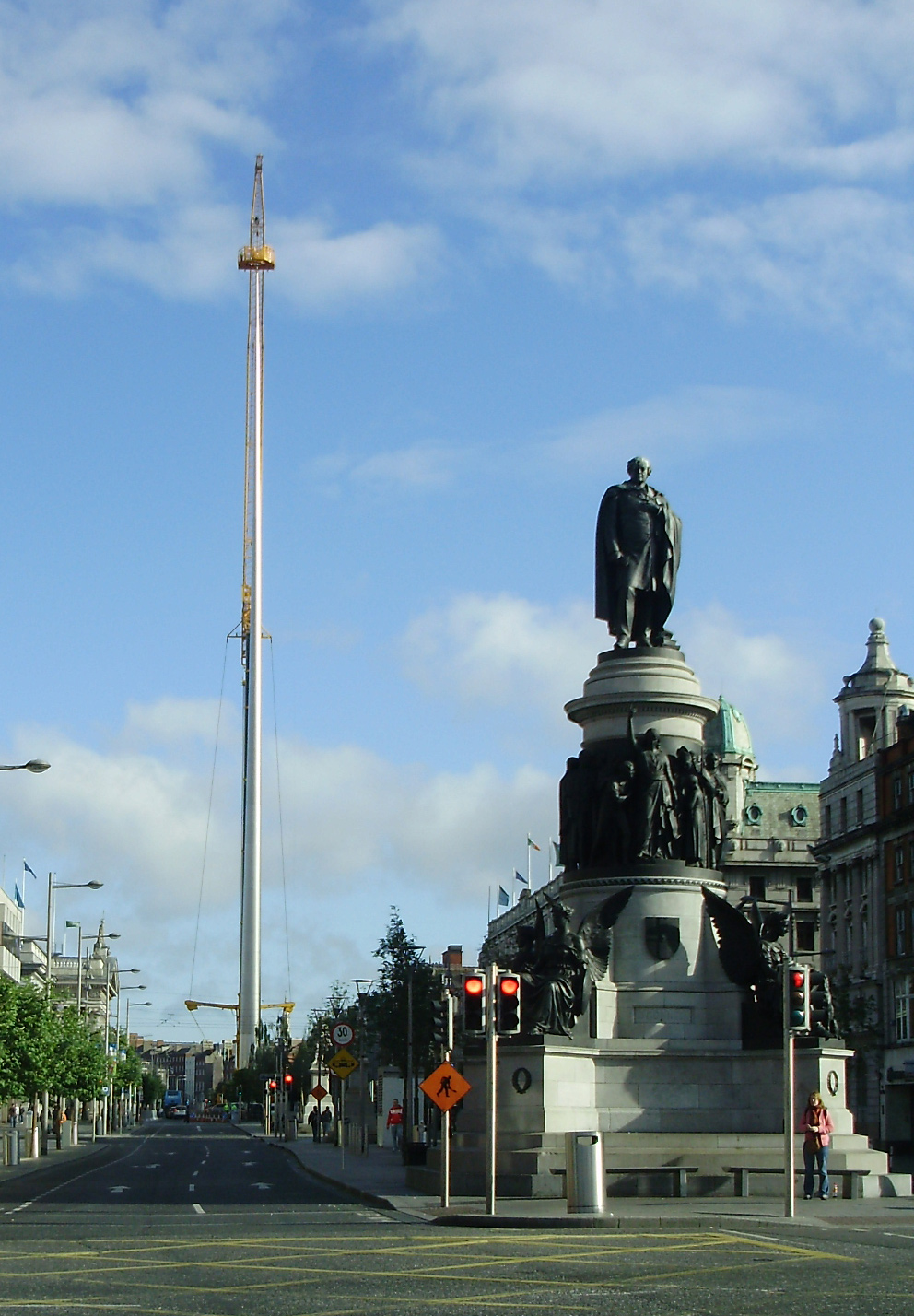
Maintenance work on the Spire, with the O'Connell Monument in the foreground

== See also ==
- Iglica
- List of public art in Dublin
