= The Other Place (theatre) =

Theatre in Stratford-upon-Avon, England

Coordinates: 52.1891°N 1.7067°W

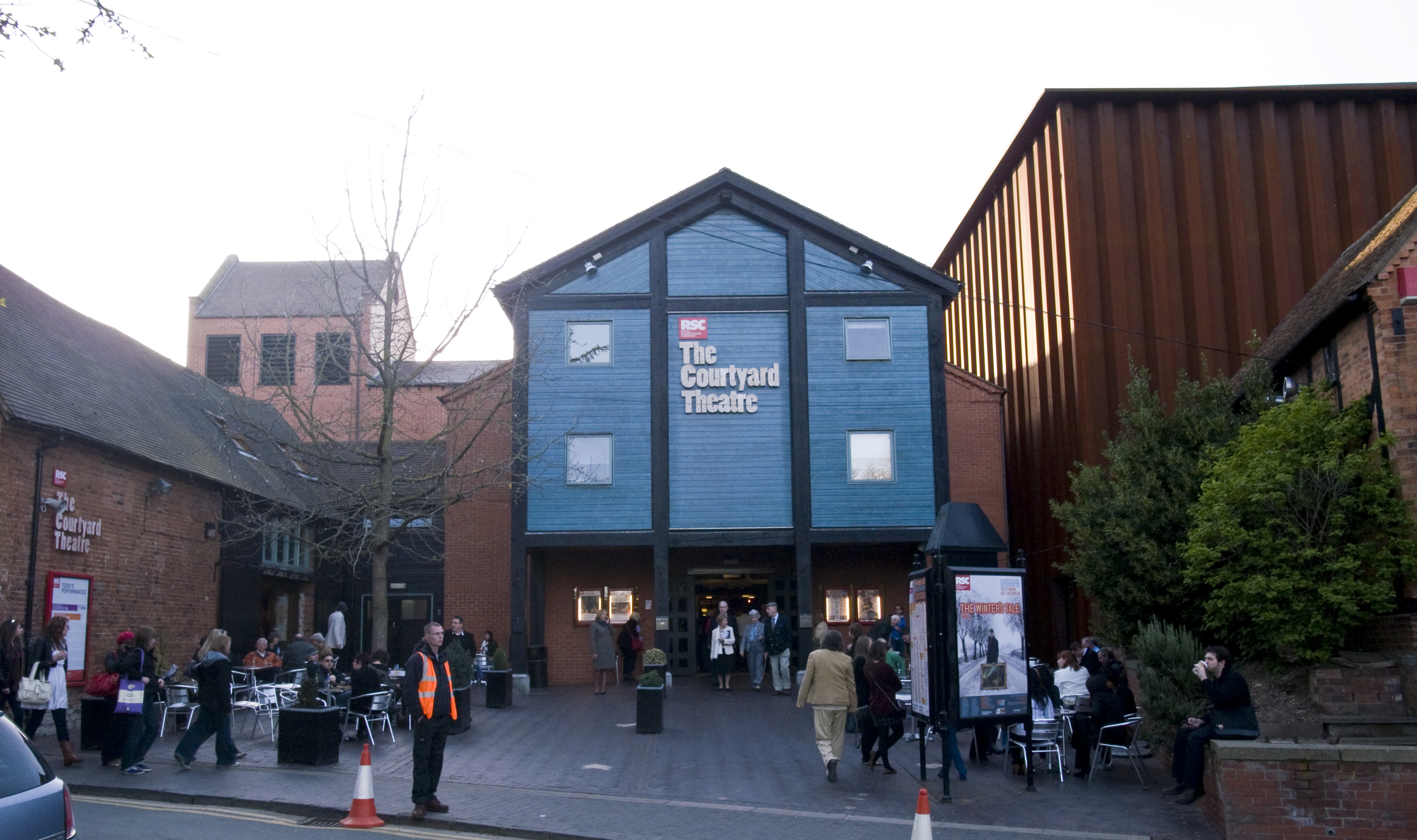
Site of the 1990 The Other Place (blue building) temporarily acted as the entrance to the Courtyard Theatre, whose stage, back-stage and auditorium were in the brown corrugated box to the right.

The Other Place is a black box theatre on Southern Lane, near to the Royal Shakespeare Theatre in Stratford-upon-Avon, England. It is owned and operated by the Royal Shakespeare Company. In 2006, an earlier version of the theatre closed and reopened as the temporary and larger Courtyard Theatre, while the Royal Shakespeare and Swan Theatres were redeveloped. In March 2016, The Other Place was reinstated as a 200-seat studio theatre.

== History ==
In 1974, the RSC acquired its first studio theatre in Stratford-upon-Avon, The Other Place. The name was chosen to reflect continuity from the company's work at The Place, London. Converted from a rehearsal room, and directed initially by Buzz Goodbody, this corrugated ‘tin hut’ became home to some of the company's most exciting small-scale and experimental work both in classical productions and in productions of work from contemporary writers such as David Edgar, Edward Bond and Peter Flannery. The Guardian's journalist Andrew Dickson would later note,

In April 1975, a production of Hamlet opened at The Other Place, the Royal Shakespeare Company's pocket-sized studio theatre in Stratford-upon-Avon. A little-known 31-year-old called Ben Kingsley was the prince. Elsewhere in the cast were Charles Dance and Mikel Lambert. The reviewers fell off their seats in shock. Nicholas de Jongh, writing for the Guardian, called the production "totally unexpected". The Times' Irving Wardle confessed: "It is a long time since I have been so gripped." He later ranked it one of his productions of the decade. In fact, played in jeans and shirt-sleeves to an audience of just 150, this Hamlet was proclaimed one of the greatest anyone could remember. One person was not there to celebrate: the director, Buzz Goodbody. A few days before, she had taken a fatal overdose of sleeping pills in her London flat. She was just 28.

It was an intimate studio theatre space and in such close confines, it was not unknown for actors to interact with the audience by sitting amongst them or rushing onto the stage through the theatre’s main entrance.

The Other Place was closed in 1989 for two years of rebuilding and was replaced with a more modern building, designed by Ian Ritchie Architects and opening in 1991. It remained true to the spirit of the original building, housing some of the company's most exciting productions as well as hosting overseas companies, workshops, teaching courses and conferences on all aspects of theatre, including the annual Prince of Wales Shakespeare School.

The new building later closed and was transformed into a foyer for the RSC's temporary Courtyard Theatre which was built on the adjacent car-park to house performances in Stratford-upon-Avon whilst the RSC's main houses, the Royal Shakespeare and Swan Theatres, were redeveloped as part of the Transformation project.

The Other Place's fifteen-year history represented "a brief, shining moment in the long history of the Royal Shakespeare Company".

== The new The Other Place ==
The RSC had anticipated the extension for the Courtyard Theatre would be a temporary building. However, plans were made to bring back The Other Place, keeping the existing structure of the current Courtyard Theatre. In 2012, planning permission was granted by Stratford District Council to reinstate The Other Place within the extended building.

The Other Place is a 200-seat studio theatre with a remodelled internal space to create a new-style, mixed use TOP which will provide opportunities for community, amateur and educational use. Over 30,000 costumes are available to the public for the first time through theatre tours. There is also space for small conferences and meetings and occasional commercial hire.

The redevelopment of the new TOP began in February 2015 and the theatre opened on 21 March 2016, in time for the 400th anniversary of William Shakespeare's death.

Funding for the new theatre came from a £3 million grant from the Arts Council England raised through the National Lottery. Funding was also received from the Gatsby Charitable Foundation, The Backstage Trust and from public donations.

This is the final phase of the Transformation project, to redevelop the entire theatre complex in Stratford-upon-Avon.

== See also ==
- Macbeth (1978 TV drama)
