= Crystal Palace Bowl =

Outdoor music stage in London, England

Coordinates: 51.4240°N 0.0691°W

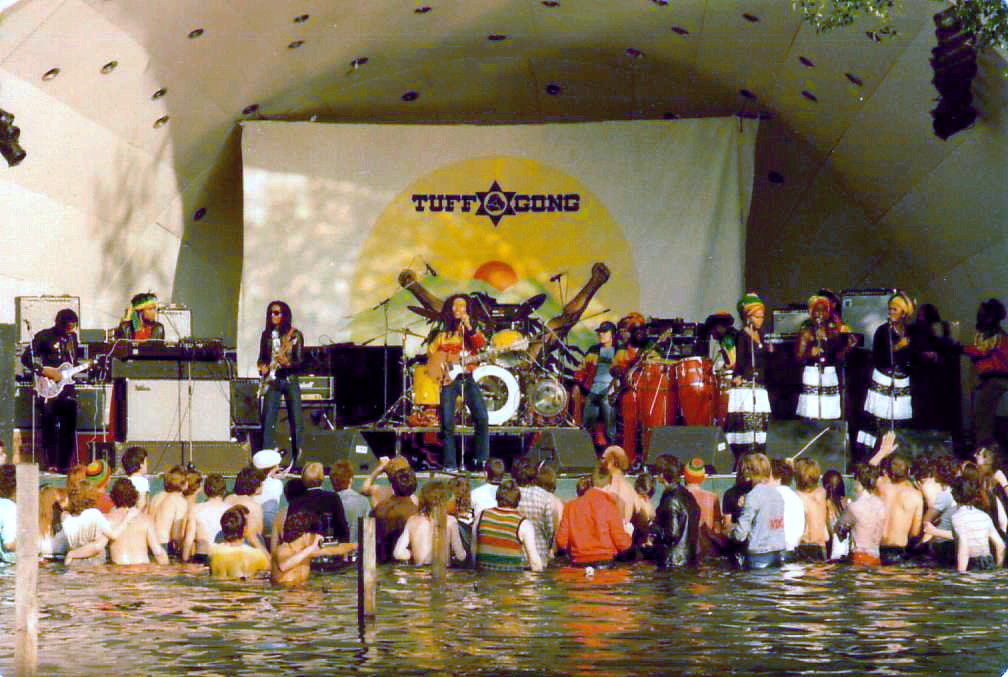
Bob Marley performing at the Crystal Palace Bowl, 1980

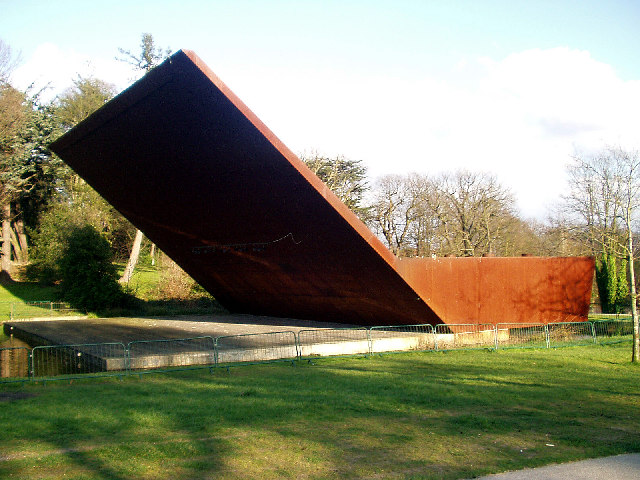
The Crystal Palace Concert Platform, constructed in 1997

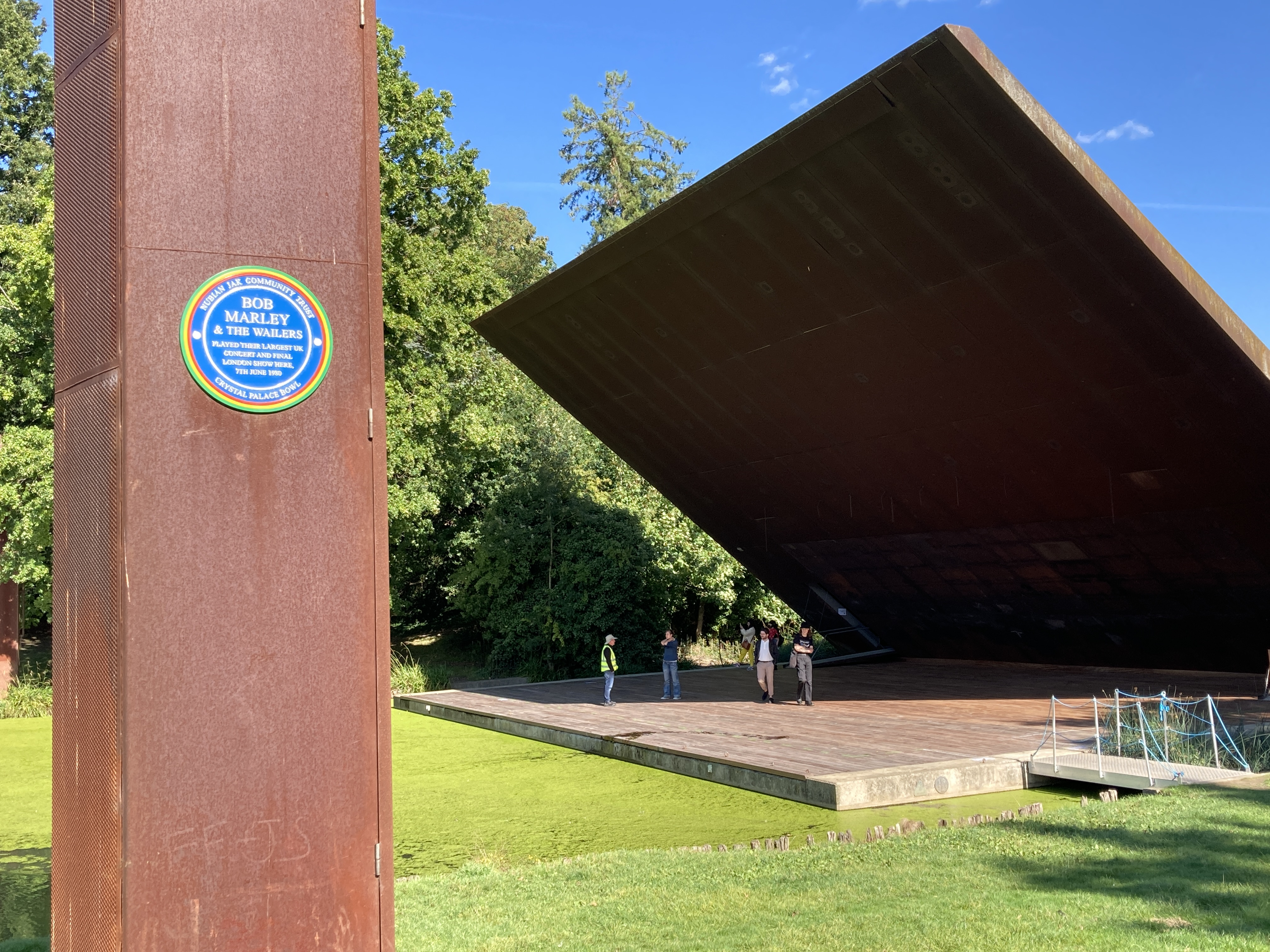
The concert platform, with the Bob Marley plaque in the foreground.

The Crystal Palace Park Concert Platform, formerly the Crystal Palace Bowl, is an outdoor stage and performance venue in Crystal Palace Park in the London Borough of Bromley.

The platform and stage are positioned within a small lake overlooking a large bowl in the landscape that is capable of holding 8,000 people. The stage can accommodate a 100 piece orchestra. The platform has what has been described as the world's first computer controlled outdoor active acoustic system, with a total of 46 speakers. A pair of columns either side of the platform contain more speakers and an amplification system.

== History ==
The Crystal Palace Bowl was constructed in 1961. It originally hosted classical concerts, before moving to popular music through the 1970s and 1980s.

Pink Floyd performed at the Bowl on 15 May 1971 to a crowd of 15,000, though their performance was marred by heavy rain. Yes performed at the venue on 31 July. At one event in 1972, The Who drummer Keith Moon acted as compere; after arriving via helicopter and reaching the stage by hovercraft, he proceeded to take a rowing boat on the lake and, while dressed as a pirate, served tea and cake to people in the crowd closest to the waters edge. Audience members, again went into the lake in 1974 when inflatable dinosaurs meant to act out, on the water, the climactic battle in Rick Wakeman's Journey to the Centre of the Earth, instead failed to fully inflate and became stuck in front of the stage, blocking the view. Bob Marley performed his largest and last ever concert in London at the venue on 7 June 1980, an event which is commemorated on the site with a blue plaque with Ethiopian/pan-African/Rastafari tri-colours. It was Marley's last UK concert, and the first one where he played "Redemption Song" accompanying himself on acoustic guitar.

The Bowl fell into disrepair and was replaced in 1997 by the Crystal Palace Concert Platform, an oxidised steel structure with an angled roof rising above a hardwood stage. The first performance took place there in August 1997. The structure, designed by Ian Ritchie Architects, was nominated for the RIBA's Stirling Prize award in 1998. The project received the 'Excellence in Design' award from the American Institute of Architects. The architects described their design as focusing on the use of natural colour, contrasting senses of gravity and levity, and simplicity of material and surface. The stage became known locally as the "rusty laptop".

The new stage was initially in use from 1997 to 2007 and subsequently fell into disrepair; the structure becoming covered in graffiti and the lake filling with algae. By 2017, the London Borough of Bromley were "exploring potential new uses".

A temporary stage was installed on the lake for a series of concerts in August 2021, with plans to restore the Concert Platform stage in 2022. This concert series runs annually, however as of 2024 is still using temporary staging.
