= Gardens of the Imagination =

Garden in Terrasson-Lavilledieu, France

Coordinates: 45°7′27″N 1°18′12″E

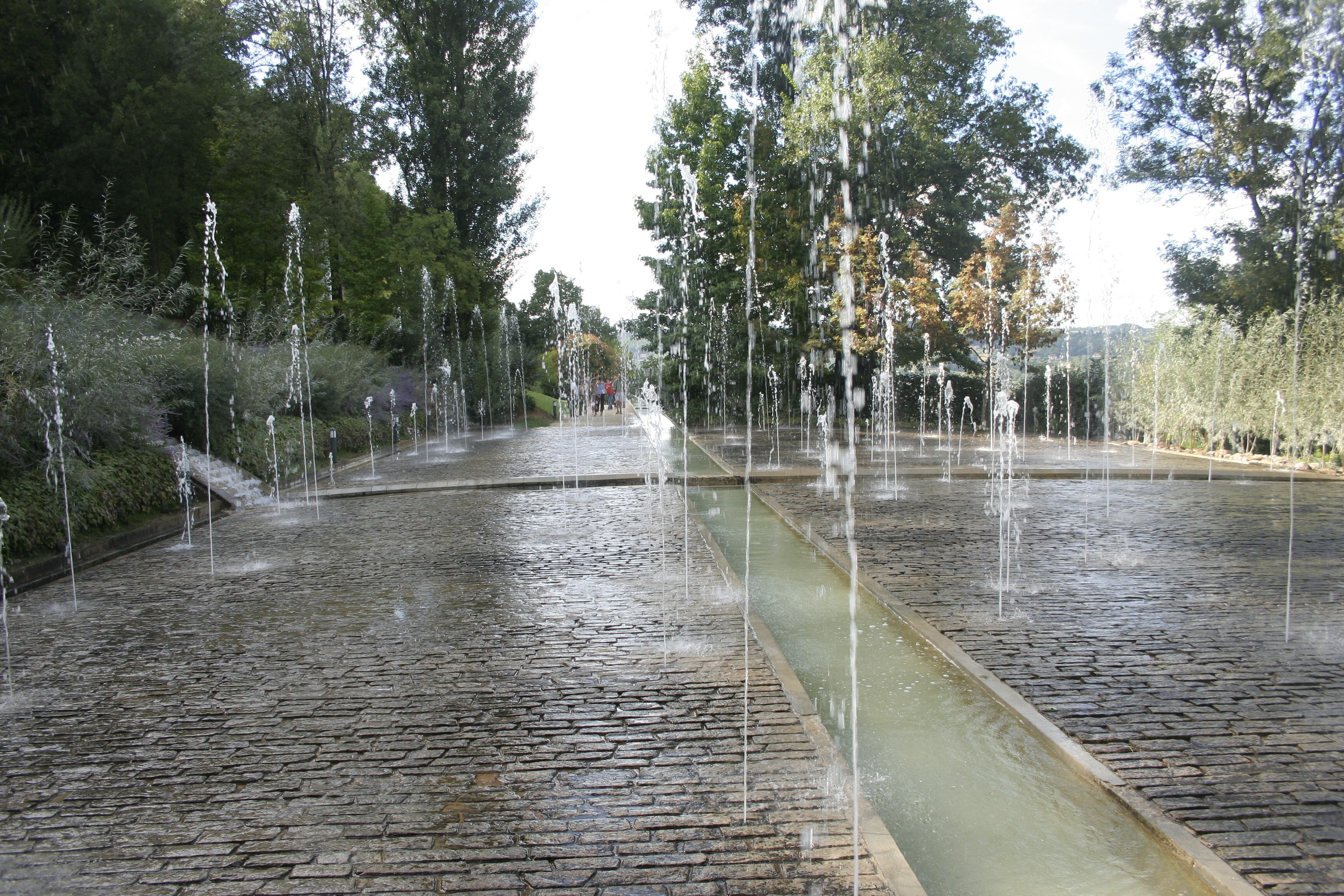

The Gardens of the Imagination (French: Jardins de l'Imaginaire) in Terrasson-Lavilledieu, in the Dordogne Department of France, is a public park and contemporary garden, classified by the Committee of Parks and Gardens of the Ministry of Culture as one of the Notable Gardens of France.

Designed in 1996 by landscape architect Kathryn Gustafson and Ian Ritchie (architect), it uses thirteen tableaux to present the myths and legends of the history of gardens; the axis of winds; perspectives; elementary gardens; the sacred wood; the tunnel of vegetation; the theater of greenery; the water garden; the terraces of moss; the topiary garden; the rose garden; the iris garden; fountains, cascade, and basins. It uses simple natural elements; trees, flowers, water and stone to suggest the passage of mankind from nature to agriculture to the city.

== Bibliography ==
- Yves-Marie Allain and Janine Christany, L'art des jardins in Europe, Citadelles & Mazenod, Paris, 2006
