= RFR Engineers =

RFR was founded in Paris in 1981 as Rice Francis Ritchie sarl, by Peter Rice (structural engineer), Martin Francis (industrial and yacht designer) and Ian Ritchie (architect). It had offices in Stuttgart, Germany; Shanghai, China; and Abu Dhabi, United Arab Emirates.

RFR is a design engineering firm with its head office based in Paris and specialises in the design of complex structures and sophisticated building envelopes that reconcile engineering and architecture. RFR has designed structures intended for unique locations like the Musée du Louvre or the Louis Vuitton store on the avenue des Champs Elysées in Paris, the Capitol in Washington, the Irish Parliament and CHQ Building in Dublin, and the library of the Indian Parliament in New Delhi.

Ian Ritchie retired from RFR at the end of the 1980s to focus his work on architecture from his studio in London. Martin Francis also resumed working for RFR quite soon. Peter Rice ran the office until his death in 1992. After that date, the company had to reorganize, but continued working on all scale projects in France and abroad. These projects include: the Passerelle Simone de Beauvoir, several TGV stations, the Fondation Louis Vuitton or the renovation of the Eiffel tower 1st floor.

RFR was placed in judicial liquidation in late 2015 due to financial problems largely stemming from its subsidiary RFR Gros Oeuvre + (RFR GO+). The French court awarded the company to Artelia, a large French engineering conglomerate that had made an offer among others to purchase RFR.

Since 2015, RFR has started a new part of its history as "RFR Structure et Enveloppe" an independent branch of Artelia Group. Several RFR employees joined back the office, and the team reaches now about 25 engineers and architects . The office is still based on the same location in the center of Paris, an pursues working on high quality structures and façade projects, as for example: La Samaritaine Department Store renovation with SANNA Architects, the Tribunal de Paris with Renzo Piano or the Saint-Denis–Pleyel station with Kengo Kuma.

== Recognition ==
RFR has won international laurels and awards including French/European steel awards, RIBA Awards, INGENIEURBAUPREIS 2006 for the AWD stadium in Hanover, Académie de l'Architecture Silver Medal for Research and Technique.

== Publications ==
• Le verre structurel, Peter Rice, Hugh Dutton, Editions du Moniteur, Paris, 1990
• Exploring materials, the work of Peter Rice, RIBA Gallery, London1992
• Peter Rice, An Engineer imagines, Artemis, London, 1994
• L'art de l'ingénieur, B.Vaudeville, JF.Blassel, H.Bardsley, M.Kutterer, Petit journal de l'exposition, 1997
• L'art de l'ingénieur : constructeur, entrepreneur, inventeur, Antoine Picon, 1997

== Lectures ==
Members of RFR regularly lecture internationally on glass structures and new geometric applications, including the Pisa university, Technical University Vienna, Austrian Academy of Sciences (ÖAW), and Ecole Spéciale d'Architecture, Paris, France.

== Notable works ==
- Louvre Pyramid
- Cité des Sciences, La Villette
- Charles de Gaulle International Airport (Roissy) Airport Terminal 2F
- Roissy Airport TGV Station
- Avignon TGV Station
- World Trade Center (Amsterdam)
- Irish Parliament Building
- Simone de Beauvoir Bridge
- Eiffel's Tower First Floor Renovation
- Paris La Défense Arena
- TGI de Paris (Paris Law Courts)
- La Samaritaine renovation
