= Kathryn Gustafson =

American landscape architect (born 1951)

- Born: 1951; Yakima
- Alma mater: Fashion Institute of Technology; Higher National School of Landscape
- Works: Diana, Princess of Wales Memorial Fountain, Gardens of the Imagination, Lurie Garden
- Awards: Jane Drew Prize (1998); honorary Royal Designer for Industry (2001)
- Website: www.gp-b.com

Kathryn Gustafson FRIBA RDI (born 1951) is an American landscape architect. Her work includes the Gardens of the Imagination in Terrasson, France; a city square in Évry, France; and the Diana, Princess of Wales Memorial Fountain in Hyde Park, London. She has won awards and prizes including the Millennium Garden Design Competition. She is known for her ability to create sculptural forms, using earth, grass, stone and water.

== Early life ==
Gustafson was born and grew up in Yakima, Washington in 1951, her father was a general surgeon. The basis of her designs comes from her memories of past settings. The region around Yakima is a desert-like plateau surrounded by mountains. According to historian Thaïsa Way, "Patches of farms sustained by a complex system of water canals providing irrigation throughout the valley offered lessons not lost on Kathryn." At the age of 18, Gustafson attended the University of Washington in Seattle, where she studied applied arts for about a year. She then moved to New York City to attend the Fashion Institute of Technology. After graduating from the Fashion Institute, Gustafson moved to Paris to be a fashion designer. Gustafson turned to landscape design. She was educated at the Ecole Nationale Superieure du Paysage in Versailles, where she graduated in 1979.

== Design work ==
Gustafson’s work is predominantly civic, institutional, and corporate, including parks, gardens and community spaces. Her award-winning projects include Westergasfabriek Culture Park in Amsterdam, Diana, Princess of Wales Memorial Fountain in London, Bay East and Gardens by the Bay in Singapore. Recent projects include Valencia Parque Central, the Novartis Campus in Basel and Marina One in Singapore.

She has become known for her creations of sculptural forms. Her work has been compared with the designs of landscape architect Isamu Noguchi. Her sensitivity to the relationship between land and sky is encapsulated in her longtime motto, "the sky is mine."

Gustafson is slated to recreate the area around the Eiffel Tower for the Olympic games in 2024. The total cost of the overhaul would be 72€ million which would be funded by revenue.

== Firms ==
Gustafson Guthrie Nichol was established in Seattle and founded by Gustafson, Jennifer Guthrie, and Shannon Nichol.

Gustafson Porter + Bowman, founded by Gustafson and Neil Porter in 1997, is situated in London. Since 2011, the firm has been based at 1 Cobham Mews Studios. The firm has international projects in the UK, Asia, Europe and the Middle East.

== Notable works ==
- Landscaping for Shell Petroleum Headquarters, 1992.
- Rights of Man Square, Évry, France, 1991.
- LeMay Museum
- L'Oreal Factory
- Corixa Headquarters
- Arthur Ross Terrace, American Museum of Natural History, 2000
- Lurie Garden, Chicago, 2004
- Diana Memorial Fountain, London, 2004
- University of Michigan: Museum of Art
- Washington Canal Park, Washington, D.C.
- Lakeshore Residence
- Esso Headquarters
- Garden of Forgiveness

== Selected awards ==
1. Arnold W. Brunner Memorial Prize in Architecture (2012)
2. American Society of Landscape Architects Design Medal (2008)
3. Royal Designer for Industry U.K (RDI: 2005) (RDI: 2001)
4. Remarkable Garden (2004)
5. Chrysler Design Award (2001)
6. Honorary Fellow RIBA (1999)
7. Jane Drew Prize (1998)
8. National Design Award in Landscape Architecture, Cooper-Hewitt (2011)
9. EU Prize for Cultural Heritage in Conservation (2010)
10. International Architecture Award from the Chicago Athenaeum (2007 and 2009)
11. AIA/UK Excellence in Design Award (2008)
12. Medalist, French Academy of Architecture (1993)
