= 1 Cobham Mews Studios =

Grade II listed building in London

- Location within London Borough of Camden Location within Greater London
- 51.54330°N 0.13278°W
- Location: Camden, North London

History
- Built: 1987–1989

Site notes
- Architectural styles: Modernism; Minimalism

Listed Building – Grade II
- Official name: Cobham Mews Studios
- Designated: 14 August 2025
- Reference no.: 1493381

1 Cobham Mews Studios (also known as Agar Grove Studios) is a grade II listed architecture studio and office in Camden, North London. Built between 1987 and 1989, it was the first building in the United Kingdom designed by David Chipperfield. Critic Lee Mallett noted Cobham Mews Studios as "one of the best buildings of the 1980s."

Cobham Mews served as a studio and office for Chipperfield's architecture firm until 2011. Since 2011, it has been the office of Gustafson Porter + Bowman, a landscape architecture firm. As of 2025, the building is planned to be redeveloped for residential use.

== Design ==
The building is on "an awkward triangular plot" and is bordered by the back gardens of other properties on all sides. Chipperfield said that the design of the building "was totally determined by this condition". Additionally, because of a planning requirement, the design was not allowed to overlook the site's neighbours.

These restrictions led to a building where most of the daylight comes from rooflights and small courtyards. The design is inspired by Victorian artist studios and Japanese architecture, and has been described by Historic England as minimalist and modernist. The building is laid out in two units with a symmetrical steel and glass brick frame, a shared entrance, and a dividing concrete wall.

The interior was simply designed with "carefully detailed, high-quality materials", according to the Twentieth Century Society (C20). Notable details include the exposed concrete stairs, large oak doors and metal handrails. The interior has remained largely the same since the building's completion, with some lights being replaced by identical new fittings and screens added to create quiet, private areas.

== History ==
The site was previously a scrapyard. The building was designed and built between 1987 and 1989 for Derwent Valley Property Developments and was the first complete building by David Chipperfield Architects; it was their architecture studio and office until 2011, when they moved to premises in Waterloo. Chipperfield's practice initially only leased one of the two units, but later also leased the other. Since 2011, it has been used by landscape architects Gustafson Porter + Bowman.

In 2024, a planning application to change the building's use to a residential dwelling was submitted, with plans to convert the building to four separate residential units. In January 2025, C20 submitted a listing application with the support of Chipperfield, saying they "[support] the conversion in principle" but noting that the building being listed would ensure any work was "sympathetic to the heritage of the building." Historic England designated Cobham Mews Studios a grade II listed building on 14 August 2025, noting its architectural interest and its significance as the first complete building by Chipperfield. The building was also the first listing for a building designed by Chipperfield.
