= Terrasson-Lavilledieu =

- Commune
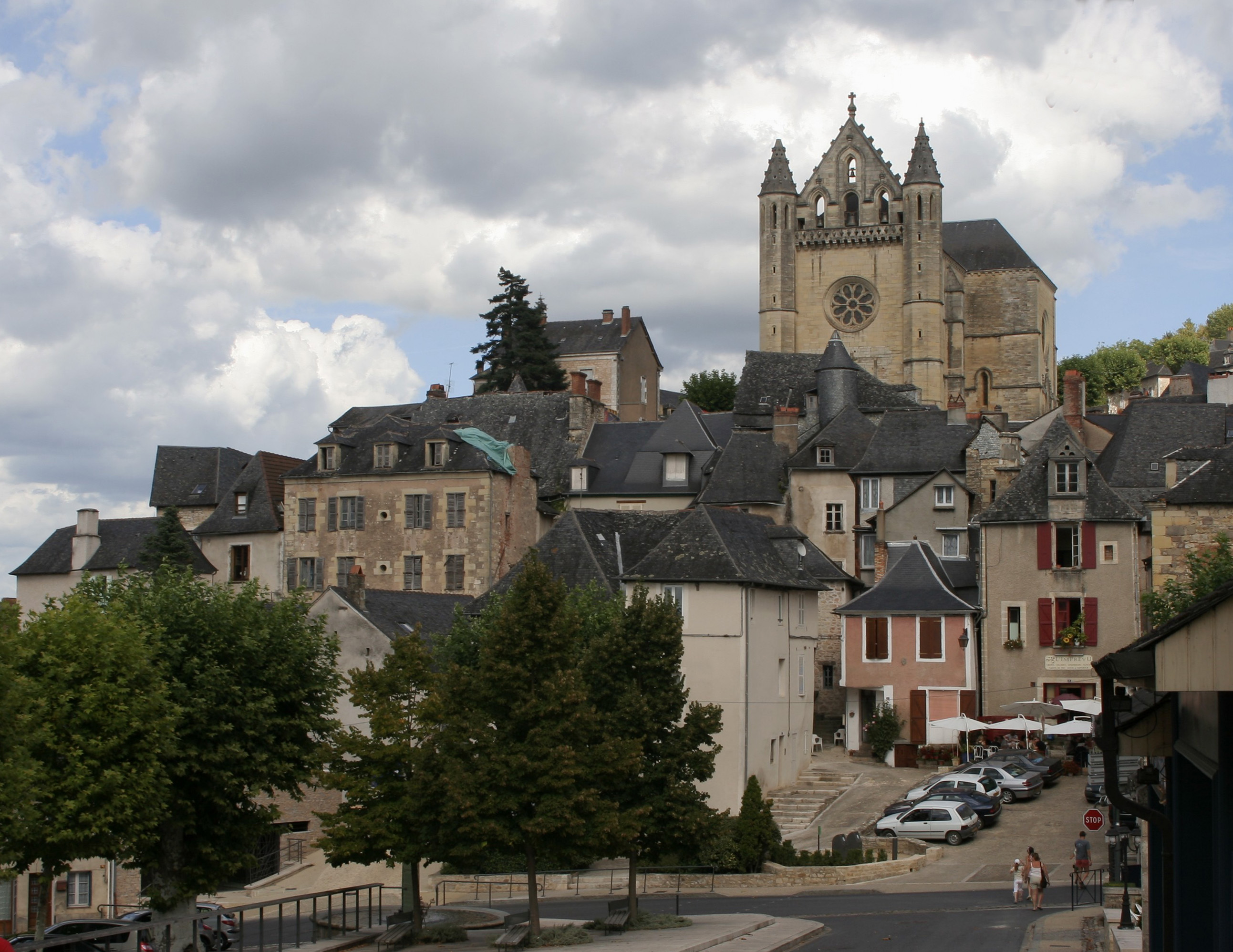
- A general view of Terrasson

- Flag Coat of arms
- Location of Terrasson-Lavilledieu
- Location within France Location within Nouvelle-Aquitaine
- Coordinates: 45°07′51″N 1°18′07″E
- Country: France
- Region: Nouvelle-Aquitaine
- Department: Dordogne
- Arrondissement: Sarlat-la-Canéda
- Canton: Terrasson-Lavilledieu
- Intercommunality: Terrassonnais en Périgord Noir Thenon Hautefort

Government
  - Mayor (2020–2026): Jean Bousquet
- Area^{1}: 39.34 km^{2} (15.19 sq mi)
- Elevation: 88 m (289 ft)
- Highest elevation: 299 m (981 ft)
- Lowest elevation: 82 m (269 ft)
- Population (2023): 6,218
  - Density: 158.1/km^{2} (409.4/sq mi)
- Time zone: UTC+01:00 (CET)
  - Summer (DST): UTC+02:00 (CEST)
- INSEE/Postal code: 24547 /24120
- ^{1} French Land Register data, which excludes lakes, ponds, glaciers > 1 km^{2} (0.386 sq mi or 247 acres) and river estuaries.

Terrasson-Lavilledieu (French pronunciation: [tɛʁasɔ̃ lavildjø]; Occitan: Terrasson e La Vila Dieu, before 1997: Terrasson-la-Villedieu) is a commune in the Dordogne department in Nouvelle-Aquitaine in southwestern France. The commune was created in 1963 by the merger of the former communes Terrasson and Lavilledieu. Terrasson station has rail connections to Bordeaux, Périgueux and Brive-la-Gaillarde.

== Population ==
The population data given in the table below for 1962 and earlier refer to the former commune of Terrasson.

Historical population

Year	Pop.	±% p.a.
1793	2,398	—
1800	2,969	+3.10%
1806	2,880	−0.51%
1821	2,709	−0.41%
1831	2,935	+0.80%
1836	2,945	+0.07%
1841	2,893	−0.36%
1846	3,095	+1.36%
1851	3,220	+0.80%
1856	3,336	+0.71%
1861	3,234	−0.62%
1866	3,682	+2.63%
1872	3,680	−0.01%
1876	3,884	+1.36%
1881	4,078	+0.98%
1886	3,997	−0.40%
1891	3,864	−0.67%
1896	3,737	−0.67%
1901	3,627	−0.60%

Year	Pop.	±% p.a.
1906	3,572	−0.31%
1911	3,794	+1.21%
1921	3,413	−1.05%
1926	3,570	+0.90%
1931	3,510	−0.34%
1936	3,657	+0.82%
1946	3,751	+0.25%
1954	3,684	−0.23%
1962	4,146	+1.49%
1968	5,528	+4.91%
1975	6,221	+1.70%
1982	6,305	+0.19%
1990	6,004	−0.61%
1999	6,180	+0.32%
2007	6,214	+0.07%
2012	6,237	+0.07%
2017	6,202	−0.11%
2023	6,218	+0.04%

Source: EHESS and INSEE (1968-2023)

== Sights ==
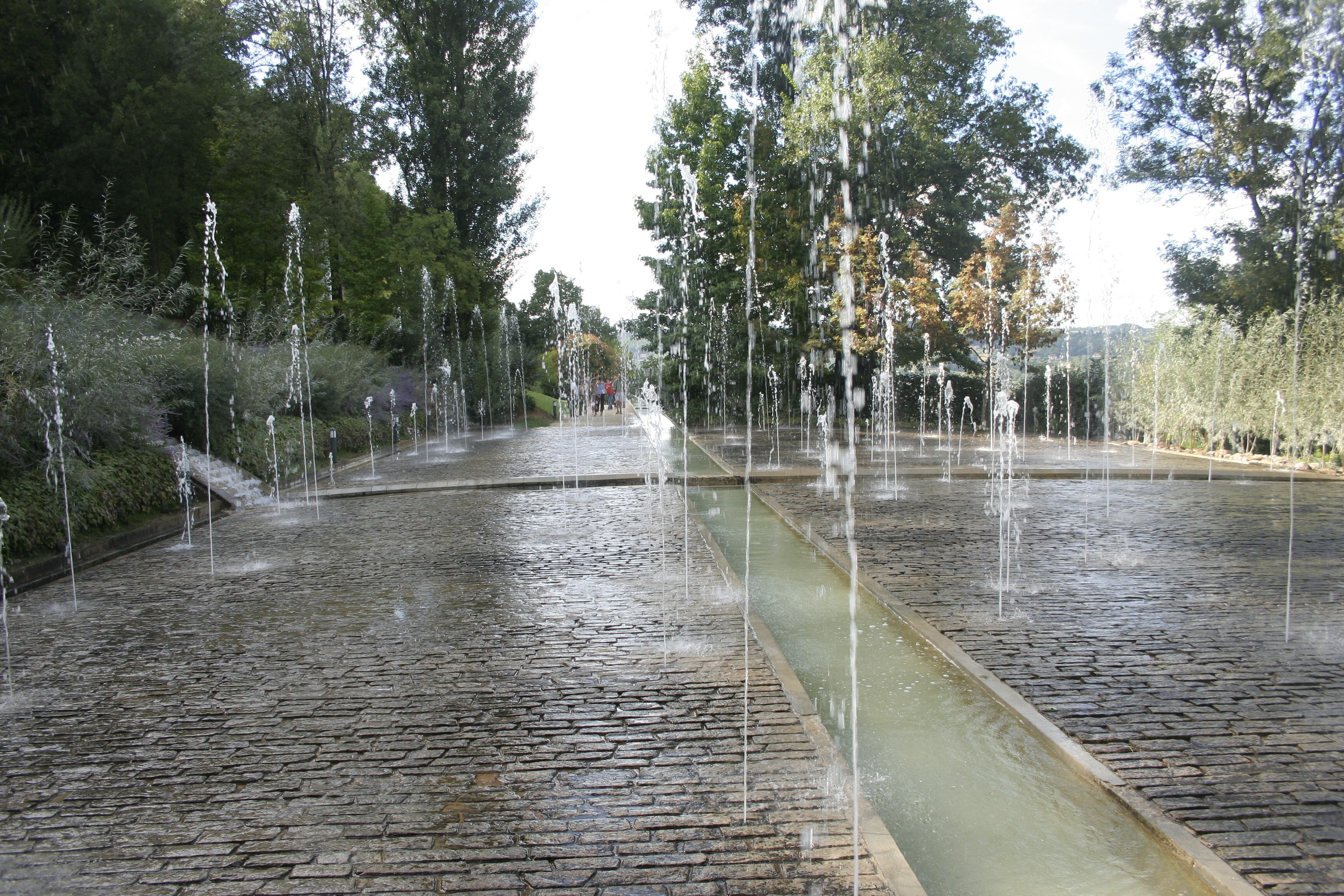
The Gardens of the Imagination

The Gardens of the Imagination (Les Jardins de l'Imaginaire)—classified as a remarkable garden by the French Ministry of Culture—are situated in Terrasson. It was designed in 1996 by landscape architect Kathryn Gustafson to present thirteen tableaux of the myths and legends of the history of gardens. It uses simple natural elements; trees, flowers, water and stone to suggest the passage of mankind from nature to agriculture to the city. It uses a symbolic sacred wood, a rose garden, topiary art, and fountains to tell the story.

== See also ==
- Communes of the Dordogne department
