= Louvre Pyramid =

Glass-and-metal pyramid in the main courtyard of the Louvre Palace

- Pyramide du Louvre (French)
- The Louvre Pyramid in 2012

General information
- Location: Paris, France
- Coordinates: 48°51′39.6″N 02°20′09.1″E
- Completed: 1989; 37 years ago

Design and construction
- Architect: I. M. Pei

The Louvre Pyramid (French: Pyramide du Louvre) is a large glass-and-metal entrance way and skylight designed by the Chinese-American architect I. M. Pei. The pyramid is in the main courtyard (Cour Napoléon) of the Louvre Palace in Paris, surrounded by three smaller pyramids of the same style which also serve as lightwells. A companion Inverted Pyramid also provides light to underground passageways of the Louvre. The large pyramid serves as the main entrance way to the Louvre Museum, allowing light to the below ground visitors hall, while also allowing sight lines of the palace to visitors in the hall, and through access galleries to the different wings of the palace. On three sides are low modernist triangular reflecting pools with fountains. Completed in 1989 as part of the broader Grand Louvre project, it has become a landmark of Paris and a symbol of the museum.

== Design and construction ==
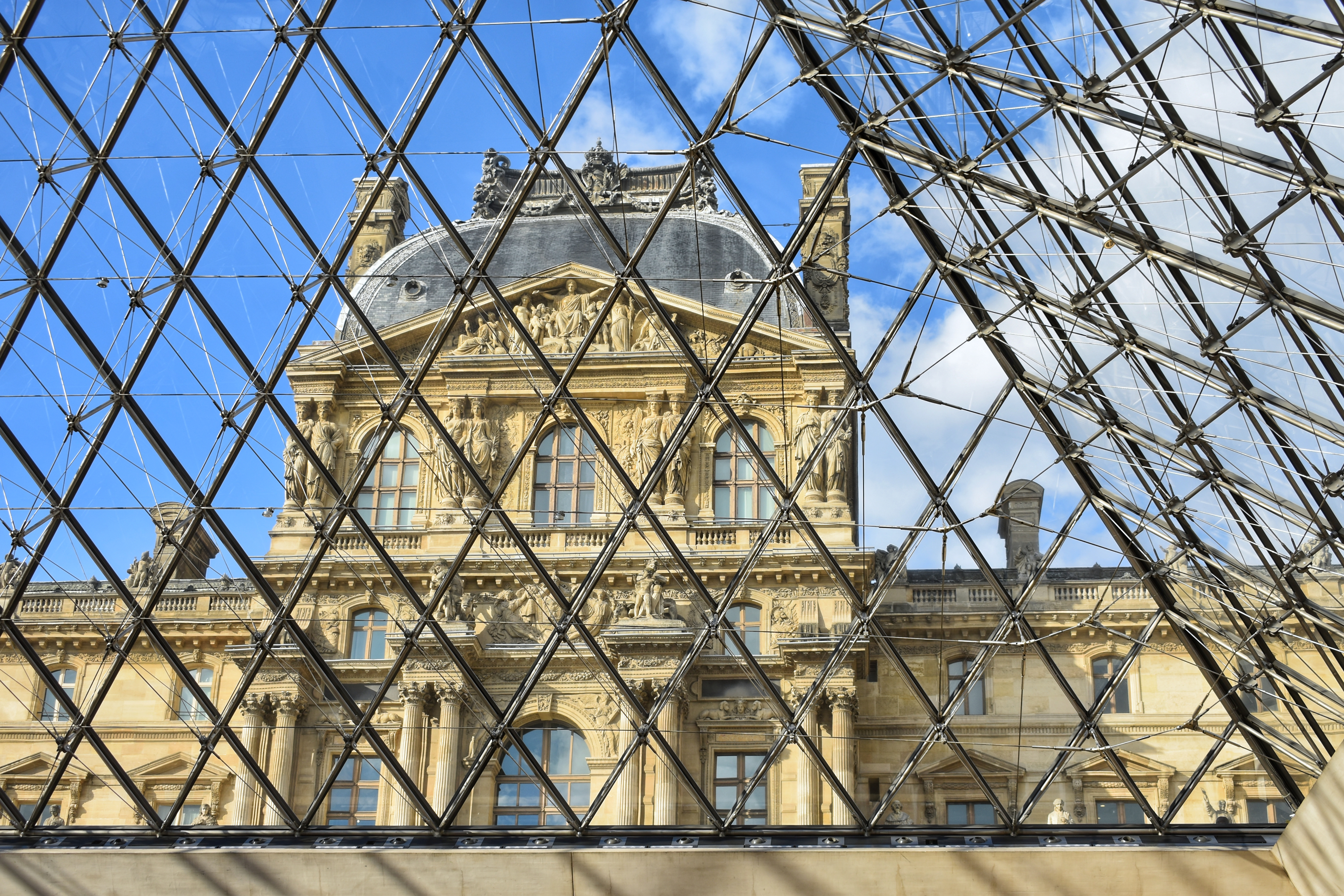
Inside pictures: a view of the Louvre Museum in Paris from the underground lobby below the pyramid.

The pyramid and reflecting pools in the Cour Napoléon shown on a schematic of the Louvre

The Grand Louvre project was announced in 1981 by François Mitterrand, the president of France. In 1983 the Chinese-American architect I. M. Pei was selected as its architect. The pyramid structure was initially designed by Pei in late 1983 and presented to the public in early 1984. Constructed entirely with glass segments and metal poles, it reaches a height of 21.6 metres (71 ft). Its square base has sides of 34 metres (112 ft) and a base surface area of 1,000 square metres (11,000 ft^{2}). It consists of 603 rhombus-shaped and 70 triangular glass segments. The sides' angle relative to the base is 51.52 degrees, an angle similar to that of ancient Egyptian pyramids.

The pyramid structure was engineered by Nicolet Chartrand Knoll Ltd. of Montreal (pyramid structure / design consultant) and Rice Francis Ritchie of Paris (pyramid structure / construction phase).

The pyramid and the underground lobby were constructed to address limitations in the Louvre's previous layout, which was no longer capable of accommodating the steadily growing number of daily visitors. Visitors entering through the pyramid descend into the spacious lobby then ascend into the main Louvre buildings.

For design historian Mark Pimlott, "I.M. Pei’s plan distributes people effectively from the central concourse to myriad destinations within its vast subterranean network... the architectonic framework evokes, at gigantic scale, an ancient atrium of a Pompeiian villa; the treatment of the opening above, with its tracery of engineered castings and cables, evokes the atria of corporate office buildings; the busy movement of people from all directions suggests the concourses of rail termini or international airports."

Several other museums and commercial centers have emulated this concept, most notably the Museum of Science and Industry in Chicago and Pioneer Place in Portland, designed by Kathie Stone Milano with ELS/Elbasani and Logan, Architects from Berkeley, California.

The construction work on the pyramid base and underground lobby was carried out by the Vinci construction company.

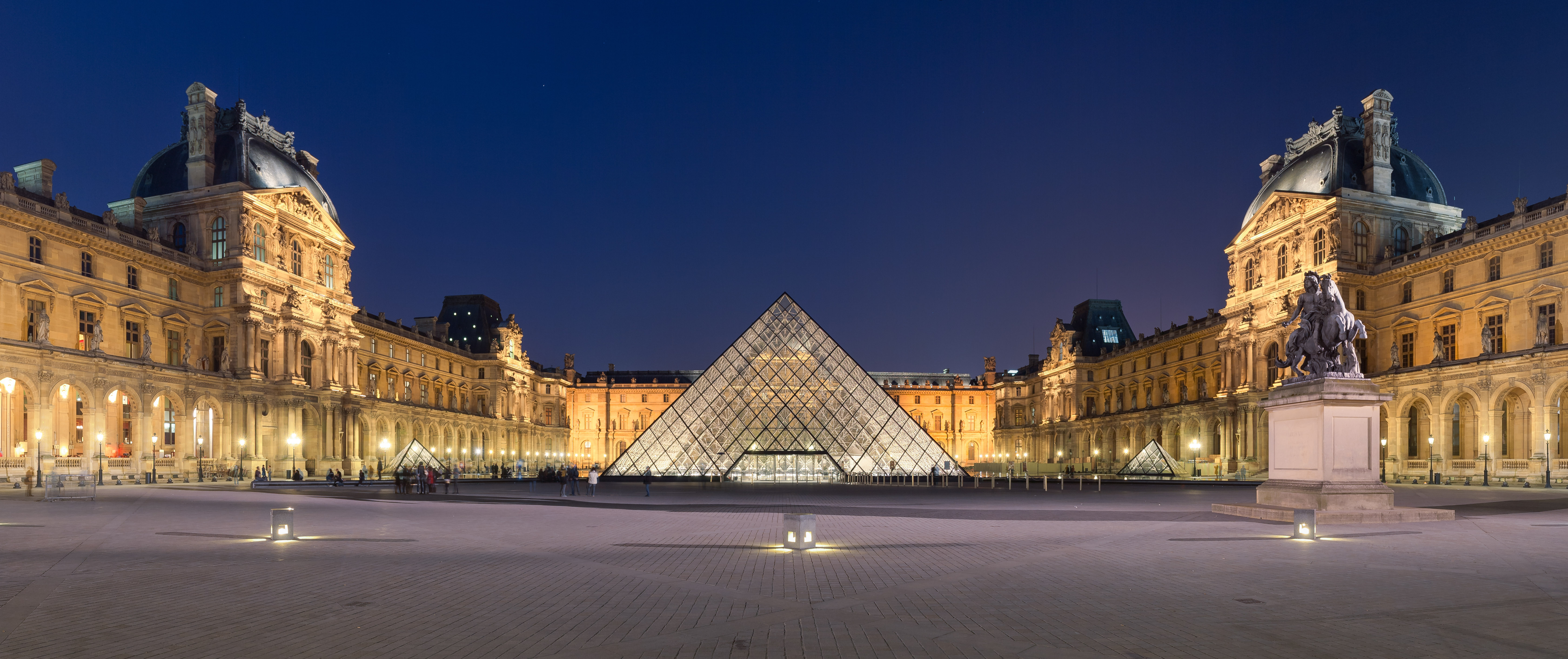
The Courtyard of the Louvre Museum at night

=== Aesthetic and political debate over its design ===
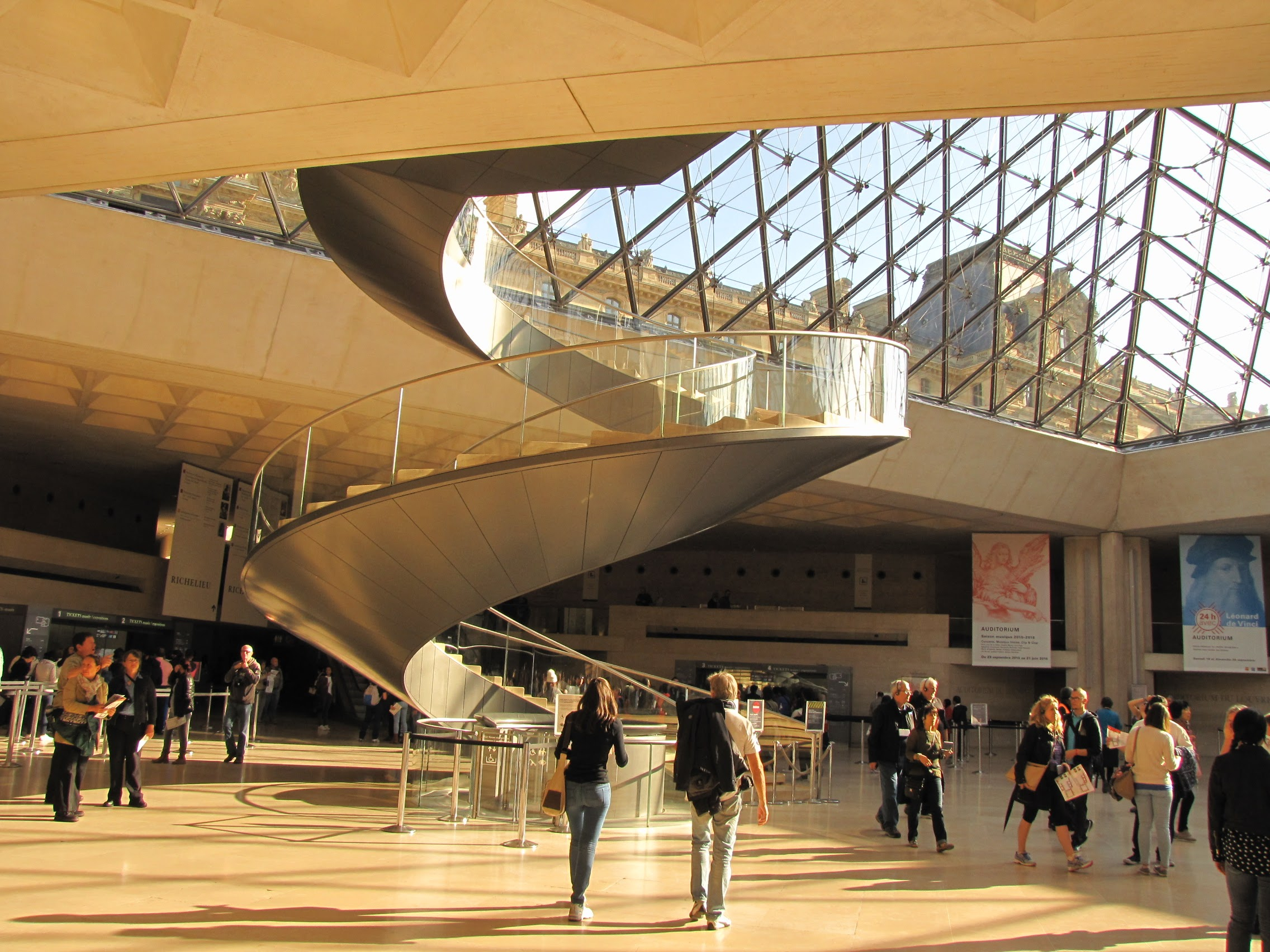
Hall Napoléon visitors center with views of museum through the glass pyramid

The construction of the pyramid triggered many years of lively aesthetic and political debate. Criticisms tended to fall into four areas:

1. The modernist style of the edifice being inconsistent with the classic French Renaissance style and history of the Louvre
2. The pyramid being an unsuitable symbol of death from ancient Egypt
3. The project being megalomaniacal folly imposed by then-President François Mitterrand
4. Chinese-American architect I.M. Pei being insufficiently familiar with the culture of France to be entrusted with the task of updating the treasured Parisian landmark.

Those criticizing the aesthetics said it was sacrilegious to tamper with the Louvre's majestic old French Renaissance architecture, and called the pyramid an anachronistic intrusion of an Egyptian death symbol in the middle of Paris. Meanwhile, political critics referred to the structure as Pharaoh François' Pyramid. Writing in The Nation, Alexander Cockburn ridiculed Pei's rationale that the structure would help visitors locate the entrance: "What Pei really meant was that in our unfolding fin de siècle, public institutions need an area (...) where rich people can assemble for cocktail parties, banquets and kindred functions, to which the word 'charity' is attached to satisfy bodies such as the IRS." Some still feel the modernism of the edifice is out of place.

== Number of panes ==
The pyramid has a total of 673 panes, as confirmed by the Louvre, 603 rhombi and 70 triangles. Three sides have 171 panes each: 18 triangular ones on the edges and 153 rhombic ones arranged in a triangle; the fourth side, with the entrance, has nine fewer rhombic and two fewer triangular ones, giving 160. Some commentators report that Pei's office counts 689.

However, a longstanding rumor claims that the pyramid includes exactly 666 panes, "the number of the beast", often associated with Satan. The story of the 666 panes originated in the 1980s, when the official brochure published during construction cited this number twice. The number 666 was also mentioned in various newspapers. One writer on esoteric architecture asserted that "the pyramid is dedicated to a power described as the Beast in the Book of Revelation.... The entire structure is based on the number six."

The myth resurfaced in 2003, with the protagonist of the best-selling novel The Da Vinci Code saying: "this pyramid, at President Mitterrand's explicit demand, had been constructed of exactly 666 panes of glass — a bizarre request that had always been a hot topic among conspiracy buffs who claimed 666 was the number of Satan." In fact, according to Pei's office, Mitterrand never specified the number of panes.

Comparison of approximate profiles of the Louvre Pyramid with other notable pyramidal or near-pyramidal buildings. Dotted lines indicate original heights, where data are available. In its SVG file, hover over a pyramid to highlight and click for its article.

== Inverted Pyramid ==
The Inverted Pyramid (Pyramide Inversée) is a skylight in the Carrousel du Louvre shopping mall in front of the Louvre Museum. It looks like an upside-down and smaller version of the Louvre Pyramid.

== Renovation ==
Designed for a museum that then attracted 4.5 million visitors a year, the pyramid eventually proved inadequate, as the Louvre's attendance had doubled by 2014. Over the next three years, the layout of the foyer area in the Cour Napoleon beneath the glass pyramid underwent a thorough redesign, including better access to the pyramid and the Passage Richelieu.

== Pei's other glass pyramids ==
Prior to designing the Louvre Pyramid, Pei had included smaller glass pyramids in his design for the National Gallery of Art's East Building in Washington, D.C., completed in 1978. Multiple small glass pyramids, along with a fountain, were built in the plaza between the East Building and the pre-existing West Building, acting as a unifying element between the two properties and serving as skylights for the underground atrium that connected the buildings. The same year the Louvre Pyramid opened, Pei included large glass pyramids on the roofs of the IBM Somers Office Complex he designed in Westchester County, New York. Pei returned again to the glass pyramid concept at the Rock and Roll Hall of Fame in Cleveland, Ohio, opened in 1995.

== Precursors at the Louvre ==
In 1605 the city of Paris demolished a 20-foot (6.1 m) pyramid opposite the Louvre after the Jesuits objected to a pillar inscription, according to the memoirs of Maximilien de Béthune (1560 – 1641).

In 1839 ceremonies commemorating the July Revolution of 1830, "The tombs of the Louvre were covered with black hangings and adorned with tricolored flags. In front and in the middle was erected an expiatory monument of a pyramidal shape, and surmounted by a funeral vase."

== See also ==
- Yann Weymouth
