= Courtyard Theatre =

Former theatre in Stratford-upon-Avon, England

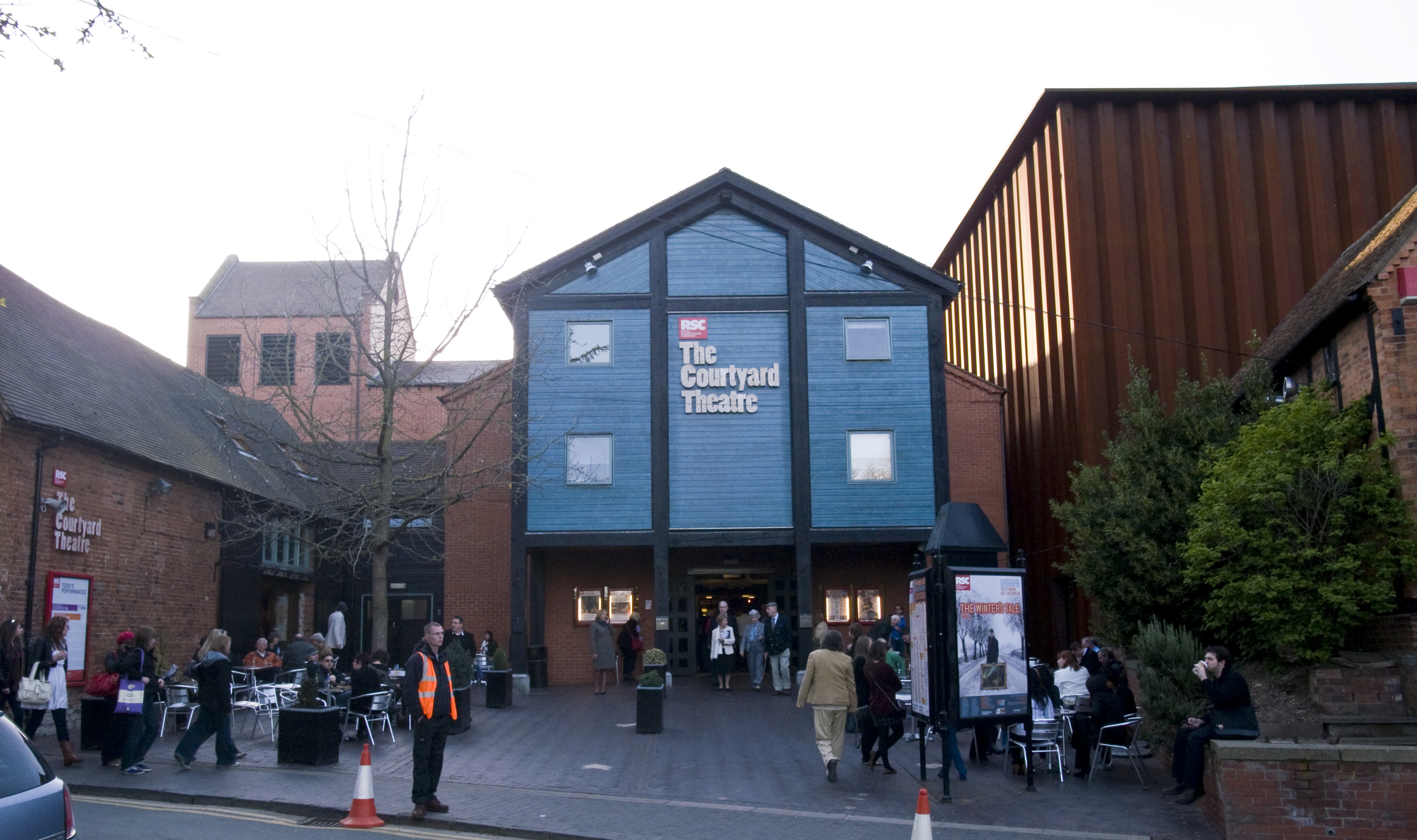
Entrance through the old The Other Place (blue building). The theatre (stage, back-stage and auditorium) was in the brown corrugated box to the right.

The Courtyard Theatre was a 1,048 seat thrust stage theatre in Stratford-upon-Avon, Warwickshire, England, operated by the Royal Shakespeare Company (RSC). It temporarily replaced The Other Place theatre during the redevelopment of the Royal Shakespeare (RST) and Swan Theatres. The last performance at The Courtyard Theatre took place in 2011. It was replaced by The Other Place in 2016, which returned as a 200-seat studio theatre in 2016.

== History ==
Designed by Ian Ritchie Architects and built in 11 months, The Courtyard Theatre was opened in August 2006 to host performances by the Royal Shakespeare Company (RSC) while its Royal Shakespeare and Swan Theatres were closed for redevelopment between 2007 and 2010 as part of a £112.8 million transformation project.

Built on the site of the RSC's studio theatre, The Other Place, The Courtyard Theatre was created within a steel extension as a full-sized working prototype for the design of the Royal Shakespeare Theatre's new 1,040+ seat auditorium and provided an opportunity to gain experience relating to sightlines, acoustics, lighting and comfort of seats. The Courtyard Theatre's awards include the National and Regional RIBA Award for Architecture 2007 and the Stratford-on-Avon Council Celebration of Excellence 2007 Design Award.

The Royal Shakespeare and Swan Theatres reopened on 24 November 2010, with the first full Shakespeare performances beginning in February 2011, with the last performance in The Courtyard Theatre, Matilda, A Musical, taking place in January 2011. Temporary planning permission for The Courtyard Theatre was in place until the end of 2012 and it was used for the World Shakespeare Festival as part of the Cultural Olympiad in 2012.

== Future ==
The Courtyard Theatre was replaced by The Other Place, which was reinstated as a 200-seat studio theatre in 2016. Despite originally intended as a temporary building, the steel extension will remain and will house the new theatre.
