= Ian Ritchie (architect) =

British architect (born 1947)

Ian Ritchie CBE RA
- Born: 24 June 1947 (age 79)
- Education: Liverpool John Moores University; University of Westminster
- Occupation: Architect
- Practice: Ian Ritchie Architects
- Website: ritchie.studio

Ian Ritchie CBE RA (born 24 June 1947) is a Scottish architect who founded Ian Ritchie Architects in 1981. His practice's projects include the RIBA Award-winning Susie Sainsbury Theatre and Angela Burgess Recital Hall for the Royal Academy of Music, Sainsbury Wellcome Centre for Neural Circuits and Behaviour, University College London and the American Institute of Architects Award-winning Royal Shakespeare Company Courtyard Theatre. Ritchie was the first foreign architect to receive the French Academie d'Architecture Grand Silver Medal for Innovation.

== Career ==
Born in Sussex, England, Ritchie graduated from Liverpool John Moores University School of Architecture in 1968. He went on to research Urban Studies for a year in Oita-Osaka, Japan and graduated with a Diploma in Architecture with Distinction from PCL, London (now University of Westminster) in 1972. After working with Norman Foster (1972–76), Ritchie spent two years in France designing and constructing projects before joining Arup's Lightweight Structures Group. (1978–81) In 1979, he founded Chrysalis Architects (1979–81) with Alan Stanton and Mike Davies. In 1981, he created Ian Ritchie Architects in London, and co-founded the design engineering firm Rice Francis Ritchie (RFR) with Peter Rice and Martin Francis in Paris. Before he left RFR in 1990, the practice had been responsible for major projects in Paris including the Bioclimatic Facades at La Villette Cité des Sciences and the Louvre Pyramids and Sculpture Courts with I M Pei. Alongside his work at Ian Ritchie Architects, Ritchie has held numerous public and professional appointments relating to his public policy interests in pan-disciplinary and environmentally intelligent design. He has acted in an advisory and teaching capacity to government, universities and charitable trusts, and regularly lectures on topics including art, urbanism and regeneration at venues worldwide. Among other accolades, Ritchie was awarded a CBE in 2000, and was elected a Royal Academician in 1998 and Professor of Architecture at the RA Schools in 2004. Ritchie (and Ian Ritchie Architects) have received over 100+ national and international award nominations and have been shortlisted four times for the RIBA Stirling Prize and EU Mies Award. Ritchie is an elected member of the Akademie der Künste, Berlin.

== Major architectural projects ==
In 1999, Ian Ritchie Architects (alongside Scottish Homes and Thenew Housing Association) completed Scotland's Home of Tomorrow - new social housing for Glasgow's East End

Image	Project	Awards and nominations
Reina Sofia Museum of Modern Art	Reina Sofia Museum of Modern Art; Madrid, Spain; Completed 1990 (with Onzono/Castro)	
Louvre Museum Inverted Pyramid	Louvre Museum Inverted Pyramid; Paris, France; Completed 1993 (with I.M. Pei and RFR)	
Leipzig Messe Glass Hall	Leipzig Messe Glass Hall; Germany; Completed 1995 (with gmp)	German Building of the Year (1997); German Steel Construction Award (1998); IABSE International Outstanding Structure Award (2000); Saxony State Award for Architecture and Construction (1996)
Crystal Palace Concert Platform	Crystal Palace Concert Platform; Completed 1997	American Institute of Architects Excellence in Design Commendation (1997); Civic Trust Award (1998); RFAC Trust Arts Building of the Year (1998); RIBA Award and Stirling Prize shortlist (1999); UK Design Council Millennium Product Award (1999); The Chartered Institute of Building Celebrating Construction Achievement Award (2000)
Jubilee Line Extension, Bermondsey Station	Jubilee Line Extension, Bermondsey Station; London, UK; Completed 1999	Concrete Society Award Certificate of Excellence (2000); British Construction Industry Special Award (2000)
	Plymouth Theatre Royal Production Centre (TR2); Plymouth, UK; Completed 2002	American Institute of Architects Design Excellence Award (2003); RIBA Award and Stirling Prize shortlist (2003); RFAC Trust Building of the Year (2003); Galvanizers Association Award Highly Commended (2004); Abercrombie Architectural Design Award: Best New Building and Overall Best (2004); European Union Prize for Contemporary Architecture Mies van der Rohe award shortlist (2005)
The Spire of Dublin	The Spire; Dublin, Ireland; Completed 2003	British Construction Industry International Award finalist (2003); RIBA Award and Stirling Prize shortlist (2004); Mies van der Rohe Award shortlist (2005)
RSC The Other Place	RSC Courtyard Theatre; Stratford-upon-Avon, UK; Completed 2006 RSC The Other Place (Transformation Project); Stratford-upon-Avon, UK; Completed 2016	RSC Courtyard Theatre: American Institute of Architects Award (2008); MIPIM Client Satisfaction Award; RIBA National Award and Stirling Prize mid-list; RICS Award - West Midlands: Community Benefit (2009); RICS Award - West Midlands: Sustainability shortlist; West Midlands Architect of the Year (2006); RSC The Other Place: AJ Retrofit: Cultural Buildings Award - Cinemas and Theatre shortlist; LEAF (Leading European Architecture Forum (LEAF) Awards: Refurbishment of the Year shortlist (2016)
Wood Lane Underground Station	Wood Lane Underground Station; London, UK; Completed 2008	British Construction Industry Award shortlist (2009); HSBC Rail Business Awards - Station Excellence (2009); Institute of Structural Engineers Award for Transport Structures shortlist (2009); National Transport Awards Rail Station of the Year shortlist (2009); Prime Minister's Better Public Building Award shortlist (2009); RIBA Award shortlist (2009)
Sainsbury Wellcome Centre	Sainsbury Wellcome Centre for Neural Circuits & Behaviour, University College London; London, UK; Completed 2016	Galvanizers Association Duplex Award winner (2017); BCI Award: Major Building Project of the Year (over £50m) winner (2016); BCI Award: Judges Special Award shortlist (2016); BCI Award: Prime Ministers Better Public Building Award shortlist (2016); Building Magazine Project of the Year finalist (2016); LEAF (Leading European Architects Forum) Award: Best Façade Design and Engineering (2016); LEAF Award: Overall Winner (2016); NLA Award: Education shortlist (2016); Offsite Construction Award: Best Use of MEP Prefabrication shortlist (2016); Offsite Construction Award: Product Innovation shortlist (2016); RIBA London Awards Shortlist (2016); Society Facade Engineering Awards finalist (2013); Surface Design Award: Public Building Exterior shortlist (2015); World Architecture Festival (WAF) Awards: Higher Education and Research shortlist (2016); World Architecture News (WAN) Facade Award longlist (2016)
	Royal Academy of Music Susie Sainsbury Theatre and the Angela Burgess Recital Hall London, UK completed 2018	Chicago Athenaeum/The European Centre International Architecture Award: Winner (2019); 2019 USITT (United States Institute for Theatre Technology): Architecture Merit Award; World Architecture Award: Winner (2019); The Institute of Acoustics Peter Lord Award: Winner (2019); Civic Trust Award: Winner (2019); Mies van der Rohe Award: Nominee (2019); AJ Specification Awards - Fit-out and Interiors: winner (2019); British Constructional Steelwork Association's Structural Steel Design Award: Shortlisted (2019); Surface Design Awards - Public Building Interior: Shortlisted (2019); Surface Design Awards - Light and Surface Interior: Shortlisted (2019); 2018 Architecture Masterprize (USA) – Educational Buildings (winner); RIBA National Award: Winner (2018); RIBA Award (London) Building of the Year: Winner (2018); RIBA Award (London): Winner (2018); AJ Retrofit of the Year Award: Winner (2018); AJ Retrofit Award - Cultural Buildings - Performance and Events: Winner (2018); AJ Architecture Awards 2018 - Higher Education Project of the Year: Winner (2018); BCI Awards - Cultural & Leisure Project of the Year: Winner (2018); FX International Interior Design Award - Public Sector of The Year: Winner (2018); NLA Award Culture & Community: Winner (2018); London Construction Awards - London Build Excellence Award: Winner (2018); RICS Award (London) Tourism & Leisure: Winner (2018); UK Property Award Leisure Architecture: Winner (2018–19); Wood Awards - Interiors: Winner (2018); WAF Awards Best use of certified timber prize: Highly Commended (2018); WAF Awards Higher Education and Research - Completed Buildings: Finalist (2018); LUX Awards Hospitality, Leisure and Faith Project of the Year: Commended (2018); WAN Awards Performing Spaces: Shortlist (2018); London Construction Awards - Interior Design of the Year: Finalist (2018); ABB LEAF Awards - Public Building: Shortlist (2018); Blueprint Awards Best Public-Use Project (Privately Funded): Shortlist (2018); AIA Award of Design Excellence: Shortlist (2018); ANC Awards - Building Acoustics: Commendation (2018); AR Future Projects: Commendation (2017); WAF Awards Education - Future Projects: Finalist (2017); NLA Awards - Conservation and Retrofit: Shortlist (2013)

== Public and professional appointments (selected) ==
- Assessor, RIBA President's Medal & Regional Awards (1987–95)
- Architectural & Design Advisor, Natural History Museum, London (1991–95)
- Commissioner, Royal Fine Art Commission (1995–99)
- President, Europan UK (1997-2003)
- Commissioner, CABE (1999-01)
- Advisor to the Lord Chancellor (1999-2004)
- Education Advisor, The Ove Arup Foundation (2000–2018)
- Governor and Design Advisor to the Board of the Royal Shakespeare Company (2001–2017)
- Design Masterplanner to the British Museum (2004–06)
- Member of the European Construction Technology Platform, High Level Group, Brussels (2005–08)
- Chair of RIBA Stirling Prize (2006)
- President's Manhattanville Advisor, Columbia University (2007–11)
- Advisor to Dean of School of Architecture, Design & Construction, University of Greenwich (2011–2018)
- Advisor to the Director Centre for Urban Science and Progress, New York University (2012–15)
- Advisor, Backstage Trust (2012–present)
- Ambassador Global Returns Project (2025)
- Visitor History of Science Museum University of Oxford (2025)

== Educational appointments (selected) ==
- Visiting Professor, Moscow School of Architecture (1992)
- Visiting Professor, Technical University, Vienna (1994–95)
- Special Professor, Leeds University School of Civil Engineering (2001–04)
- Professor of Architecture, Royal Academy of Arts (2004–12)
- Honorary Visiting Professor, Liverpool University (2009–2025)
- Member Academic Board Politecnico di Milano Building Engineering / Architecture (2021-)

== Awards and honours (selected) ==
- Fellow, Royal Society of Arts (1987)
- Elected as Royal Academician (1998)
- Commander of the Order of the British Empire (CBE) (2000)
- French Academie d'Architecture Grand Medaille d'Argent for Innovation (2000)
- Honorary Doctorate, University of Westminster (2000)
- Honorary Fellow, Royal Incorporation of Architects in Scotland (2009)
- Honorary Fellow, American Institute of Architects (2010)
- Fellow, Society of Façade Engineering (2012)
- Member, Academy of Arts, Berlin (2013)
- Honorary Member, Society of Czech Architects (2018)
- Honorary Fellow, Royal Academy of Music (2018)
- Honorary Masters Degree, Polytechnic University of Milan (2019)
- Honorary Doctor of Honoris Causa, Technical University of Cluj-Napoca (2022)
- Honorary Fellow, Royal Academy of Engineering (2024)
- Honorary Fellow Royal Scottish Academy (2025)
- Fellow Royal Society of Edinburgh (2026)

== Bibliography ==
- Ian Ritchie, ‘(well) Connected Architecture’, Academy Editions: London, 1994, ISBN 978-1-85490-294-8
- Ian Ritchie, ‘Architektur mit (guten) Verbindungen‘, Ernst & Sohn GMBH: Berlin, 1994, ISBN 978-3-433-02478-2
- Ian Ritchie, Ingerid Helsing Almaas, The Biggest Glass Palace in the World, Ellipsis: UK, 1997, ISBN 978-1-899858-21-7
- Ian Ritchie Architects, ‘Plymouth Theatre Royal TR2’, Categorical Books: UK, 2003, ISBN 978-1-904662-00-6
- Ian Ritchie Architects, ‘The Spire’, Categorical Books: UK, 2004, ISBN 978-1-904662-01-3
- Ian Ritchie, ‘The RSC Courtyard Theatre’, Categorical Books: UK, 2006, ISBN 978-1-904662-05-1
- Ian Ritchie, H. Rambow, ‘The Leipzig Book of Drawings’, Royal Academy of Arts: London, 2007, ISBN 978-1-905711-01-7
- Ian Ritchie, ‘Lines’, Royal Academy of Arts: London, 2010, ISBN 978-1-905711-81-9
- Ian Ritchie, ‘Being: An Architect’, 2 volumes, Royal Academy of Arts: London, 2014, ISBN 978-1-907533-08-2
- Ian Ritchie Editor, ‘Neuro Architecture’, Architectural Design Magazine: Wiley, Hoboken, USA 6/2020 ISBN 978-1-119-68537-1
- Louis Farrugia, Alex Torpiano, Ian Ritchie, ‘Renewal Architects’, Unicorn: Lewes, UK, 2023, ISBN 978-1-911397-36-6
- Ian Ritchie, ‘Light’, Unicorn: Lewes, UK, 2023, ISBN 978-1-911397-75-5
- Ian Ritchie, ‘Life’, Unicorn: Lewes, UK 2024, ISBN 978-1-916846-41-2
- Gareth Wardell, Ian Ritchie, ‘30 Tenets of Liberty’, Grousebeater: Edinburgh, 2024, ISBN 979-8-3006-4862-6
