= Ministry of Economics and Finance (France) =

Government ministry of France

Coordinates: 48°50′21″N 2°22′33″E

Minister of Economics, Finance and Industrial and Digital Sovereignty
- Ministère de l'Économie, des Finances et de la Souveraineté industrielle et numérique

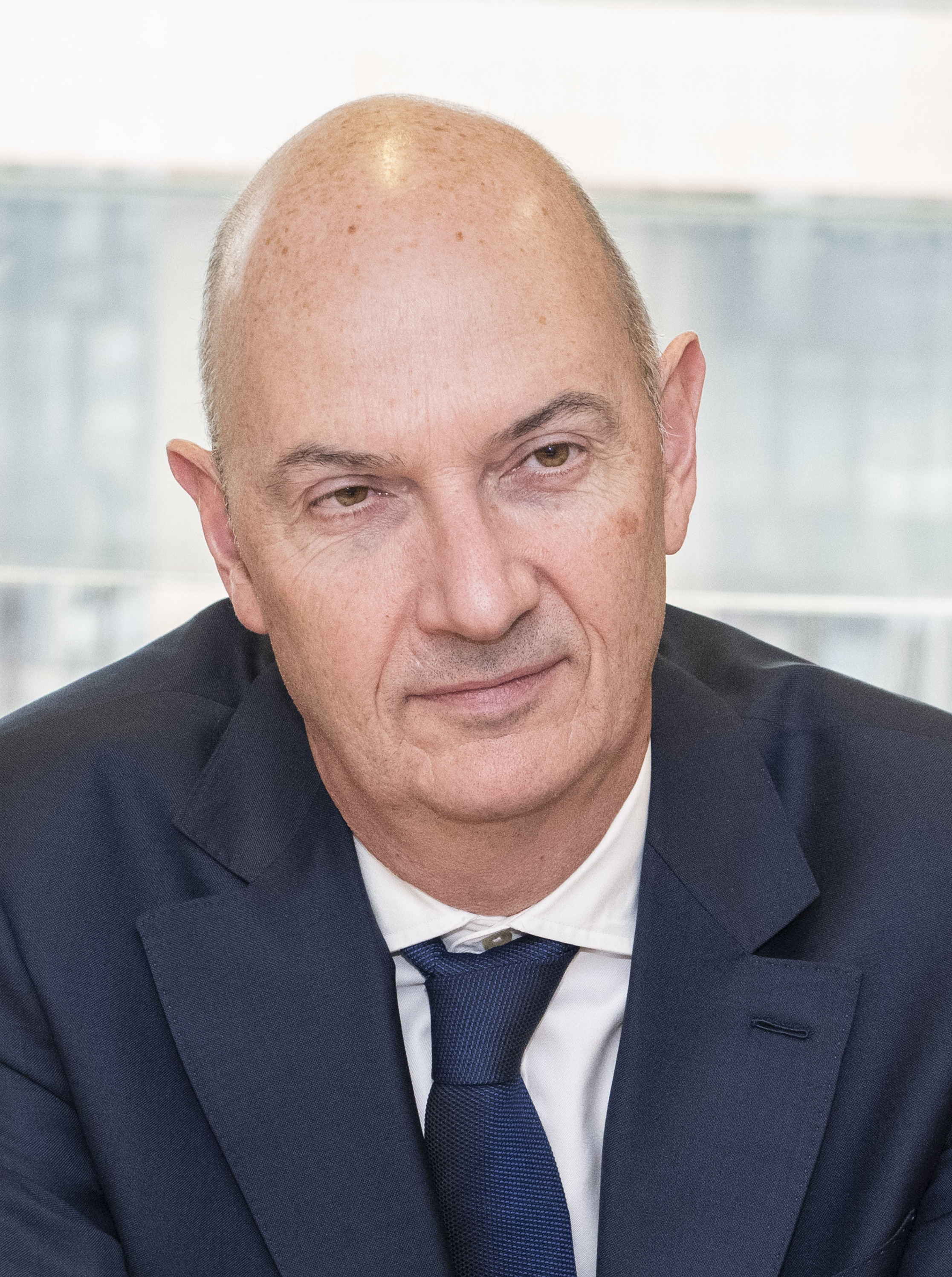
- Incumbent; Roland Lescure since 5 October 2025
- Style: Monsieur le ministre
- Member of: Council of Ministers
- Reports to: President of the Republic and to Parliament
- Seat: Ministry of the Economy and Finance building Bercy, Paris
- Appointer: President of the Republic
- Term length: No fixed term Remains in office while commanding the confidence of the National Assembly and the President of the Republic
- Constituting instrument: Constitution of 4 October 1958
- Precursor: The title of "Minister of Finance" has existed since 1518 in the Ancien Régime
- Formation: 23 July 1958
- First holder: Antoine Pinay
- Salary: €9,940 per month
- Website: www.economie.gouv.fr

The Ministry of Economics, Finance and Industrial and Digital Sovereignty (French: Ministère de l'Économie, des Finances et de la Souveraineté industrielle et numérique, pronounced [ministɛʁ d(ə) lekɔnɔmi e definɑ̃s]), informally referred to as Bercy, is one of the most important ministries in the Government of France. Its minister is one of the most prominent cabinet members after the prime minister. The name of the ministry has changed over time; it has included the terms "economics", "industry", "finance" and "employment" throughout its history.

== Responsibilities ==
The Minister of Economics and Finance oversees:

- the drafting of laws on taxation by exercising direct authority over the Tax Policy Board (Direction de la législation fiscale) of the General Directorate of Public Finances (Direction générale des Finances publiques), formerly the Department of Revenue (Direction générale des impôts);
- national funds and financial and economic system, especially with the Office of the Treasurer and Receiver General (Direction générale du Trésor or French Treasury), not to be confused with the Public Treasury (Trésor public), that is the Office of the Comptroller-General (Direction générale de la comptabilité publique) under the authority of the Minister of Public Action and Accounts);
- the development, regulation and control of economics including industry, tourism, small business, competition, and consumer security, and other matters excluding energy, industrial security, environmental affairs and transportations which are under the authority of the Ministry of Ecology;
- employment policies and career education.

The officeholder, who has authority on the financial assets of the state, the financial and economic national system and the taxation rules overall, also represents France in the Economic and Financial Affairs Council (ECOFIN).

== Location ==
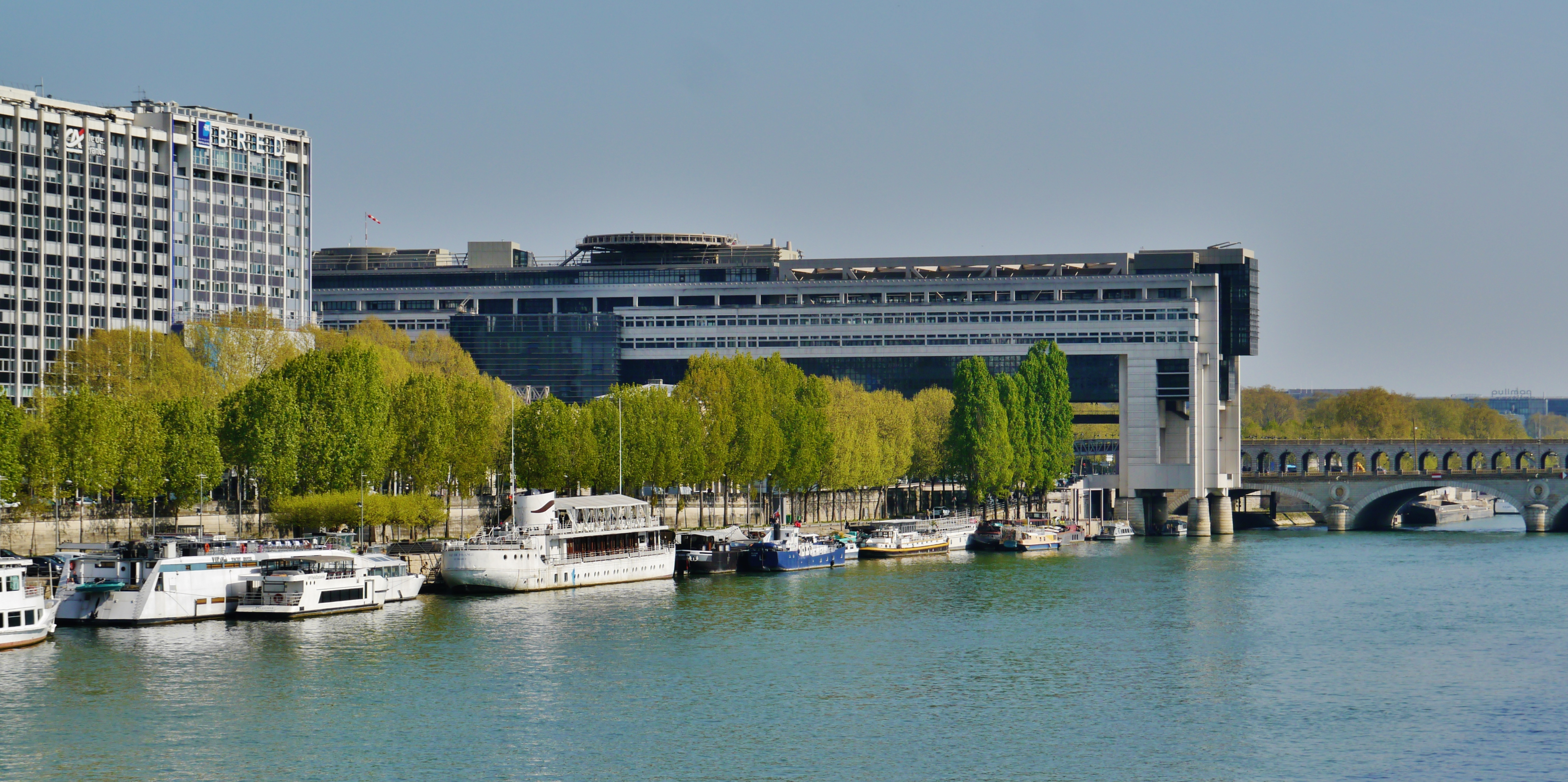
Seat of the Ministry of Economics and Finance at Bercy

The Ministry of the Economy and Finance building is situated in Bercy, in the 12th arrondissement of Paris. The building it shares with the Ministry of Public Action and Accounts extends to the Seine, where there is a wharf with fast river boats for faster liaisons to other government agencies. It is also served by Paris Metro lines 6 and 14 at Bercy station.

The 5-hectare complex is made of five buildings: Sully and Turgot buildings (both occupied by the Directorate-General of the Taxes), the Necker building (along the railways), the Vauban building, and the Colbert building (housing the Ministries). The Colbert building contains two 70-meter long arches weighting 8000 tons each (weight of the Eiffel Tower). It is the only administrative building in Paris to have been built at a perpendicular angle against the Seine, and the only one that has part of its foundations in the Seine's water.

The saying "the Bercy Fortress" (French: la forteresse de Bercy) refers to the ministry as a dark department with obscure civil servants, especially of high rank. This is emphasised by the impressive look of the building.

During the Grands Projets of François Mitterrand, it was decided that the Ministry of Finance would leave the Louvre's Richelieu wing where it had been located for 110 years. Forty other offices of the Ministry spread around the capital would be reunited in the new building.

After an architectural contest, Paul Chemetov and Borja Huidobro were selected in December 1982 to design the Colbert, Necker and Vauban buildings. Louis Arretche and Roman Karasinski were selected in July 1983 to design the Tugot and Sully buildings.

Construction started in 1984. In 1989, the Ministry's employees left the Louvre to move into the new building. Pierre Bérégovoy was the first finance minister to work in the new building.

== Organisation ==
Roland Lescure has been Minister of Economics and Finance since October 5, 2025. In the government of Prime Minister Sébastien Lecornu, he is assisted by three junior ministers: Amélie de Montchalin as Minister for Public Accounts, Marc Ferracci as Minister for Industry and Véronique Louwagie as Minister for Small and Medium-Sized Enterprises.

== See also ==
- List of finance ministers of France
- Superintendent of Finances (1561–1661)
- Controller-General of Finances (1661–1791)
- Wine warehouses of Bercy
