= Josette Garnier =

French biogeochemist

Josette Garnier is a French biogeochemist. She is research director at the French National Centre for Scientific Research (CNRS). She won the 2016 Ruth Patrick Award.

== Education ==
She graduated from Pierre and Marie Curie University. She studied the price of land in the 1700s and the Riverstrahler model of river nutrient transfer.

== Works ==
- Billen, Gilles; Aguilera, Eduardo; Einarsson, Rasmus; Garnier, Josette; Gingrich, Simone; Grizzetti, Bruna; Lassaletta, Luis; Noë, Julia Le; Sanz-Cobena, Alberto (2021-06-18). "Reshaping the European agro-food system and closing its nitrogen cycle: The potential of combining dietary change, agroecology, and circularity". One Earth. 4 (6): 839–850. Bibcode:2021OEart...4..839B. doi:10.1016/j.oneear.2021.05.008. ISSN 2590-3330. S2CID 237924319.
- Billen, Giles; Barles, Sabine; Garnier, Josette; Rouillard, Josephine; Benoit, Paul (2009). "The food-print of Paris: long-term reconstruction of the nitrogen flows imported into the city from its rural hinterland". Regional Environmental Change. 9 (1): 13–24 – via Metabolism of Cities.
- Glibert, Patricia M.; Kana, Todd M. (2016-07-25). "Ecological Processes and Nutrient Transfers from Land to Sea". Aquatic Microbial Ecology and Biogeochemistry: A Dual Perspective. Springer. p. 185. ISBN 978-3-319-30259-1.
- Flipo, Nicolas; Labadie, Pierre; Lestel, Laurence (2021-01-30). "Trajectories of the Seine River Basin". The Seine River Basin. Springer Nature. ISBN 978-3-030-54260-3.
