= Ministry of the Economy and Finance building =

Government office in Bercy, Paris

Ministry of the Economy and Finance
- Ministère de l'Économie et des Finances
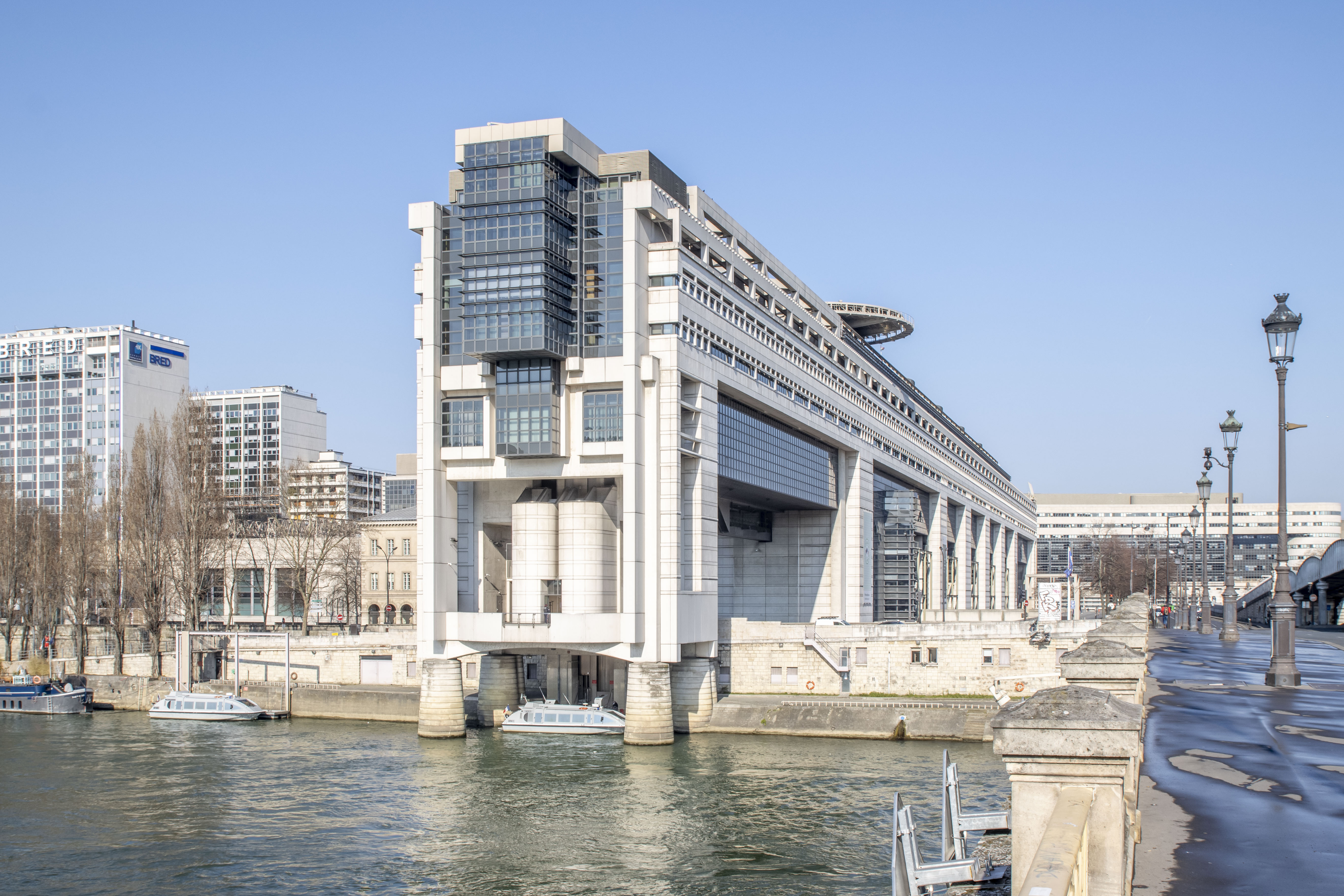
- Interactive map of the Ministry of the Economy and Finance area
- Alternative names: Bercy

General information
- Type: Government building; Office building
- Architectural style: Postmodern architecture
- Location: 12th arrondissement, Paris, France
- Current tenants: Ministry of the Economy and Finance (Note: As of December 2024 the Minister of the Economy, Finance, and Industrial and Digital Sovereignty. The name and remit of French government departments are regularly changed: a single economic and financial department has been in stable existence since 1946, although it has been temporarily split in some governments, in up to four standalone departments in 2012–2014. They are managed by a single secretariat general in any case.)
- Year built: 1984–1989

Design and construction
- Architects: Paul Chemetov; Borja Huidobro; Louis Arretche; Roman Karasinsky
- Architecture firm: Atelier de l'urbanisme et de l'architecture (AUA)

The Ministry of the Economy and Finance building (French: siège du ministère de l'Économie et des Finances) is the headquarters of the French Ministry of the Economy and Finance or the departments in which it is occasionally redistributed, built in the 1980s in the Bercy area of the 12th arrondissement of Paris. It is commonly known as Bercy, a term also used by metonymy for the ministry itself.

It was commissioned as part of the Grands Travaux of President François Mitterrand, and designed by the architects Paul Chemetov and Borja Huidobro for the main area, as well as Louis Arretche and Roman Karasinsky for the two northwestern buildings. It is a massive complex made of several buildings, named after major French statesmen (Colbert, Necker, Sully, Turgot, Vauban), as well as of a detached convention centre. It includes both a port, where the southern end plunges into the river Seine, and a heliport, although no longer used. In addition, the building spans over two major roads, and has a wing adjacent to the gare de Lyon.

As typical of postmodern architecture, it includes inspirations from the history of architecture, such as the general shape of a viaduct, a (dry) moat, and a large ceremonial bronze gate. The entrance, and postal address (139, rue de Bercy), is a pre-existing and much smaller pavilion. (Note: The two pre-existing pavilions, protected since 1962, are often mistakenly presented as former octroi houses built in the 18th century by Claude-Nicolas Ledoux as part of the Wall of the Ferme générale. The original customs houses were in fact destroyed; the present ones are fodder warehouses built in 1828.) It is sometimes called a "citadel" or "fortress", in reference to the building's impressive architecture as well as to the power of the department within the Government of France.

Construction lasted between 1984 and 1989. The ministry was previously housed since 1871 in the Richelieu Wing of the Louvre, which needed to be vacated as part of the Grand Louvre project.

== History ==
The move of the Ministry of the Economy and Finance was decided in 1981, as part of the Grands Travaux launched by the new president François Mitterrand, in order to free up the Richelieu Wing of the Louvre Palace and extend the Louvre Museum to the entire palace for the Grand Louvre project. The department headquarters had been housed there since May 1871, in expansions built during the Second Empire for the Ministry of State and other ministerial offices alongside rue de Rivoli. Most employees, which numbered several thousands, were actually scattered in other government buildings, and another purpose of the move was for a large part of them to work in a single location.

The place chosen was in the Bercy area in eastern Paris, which was being redeveloped; an alternative choice would have been the caserne Dupleix in the 15th arrondissement. The main lot was previously used by the Ministry of Veterans, which moved out in 1983. Other Grands Projets in the area include the opéra Bastille and the new Bibliothèque nationale de France headquarters across the river. Opposite the Colbert building across boulevard de Bercy is the Accor Arena, also built in the 1980s.

There were 137 submissions in the competition, launched in March 1982, from which the jury selected four; the winning entry, that of Paul Chemetov and Borja Huidobro from the Atelier de l'urbanisme et de l'architecture (AUA), was chosen by Mitterrand in December 1982. Additional buildings to the northwest of the initial lot, which became Turgot and Sully, were commissioned to Louis Arretche and Roman Karasinsky in July 1983 based on an earlier submission to the SNCF. Chemetov recalled that Mitterrand took a limited interest in the project by comparison with other of the Grands Travaux, and might have chiefly wanted to symbolically tone down the influence of the powerful department.

Construction lasted between 1984 and 1989, at a cost of 3,7 billion francs. It was described by the civil servant who coordinated the project as the largest office building construction ever carried out in France. There were significant cost overruns, as is common for massive construction projects, but also because the initial stages had been rushed due to the parallel launch of the Grand Louvre operation, and the competition was held with little financial consideration. This was in fact used by Mitterrand to overrule criticism from the department over the cost of his other Grands Projets.

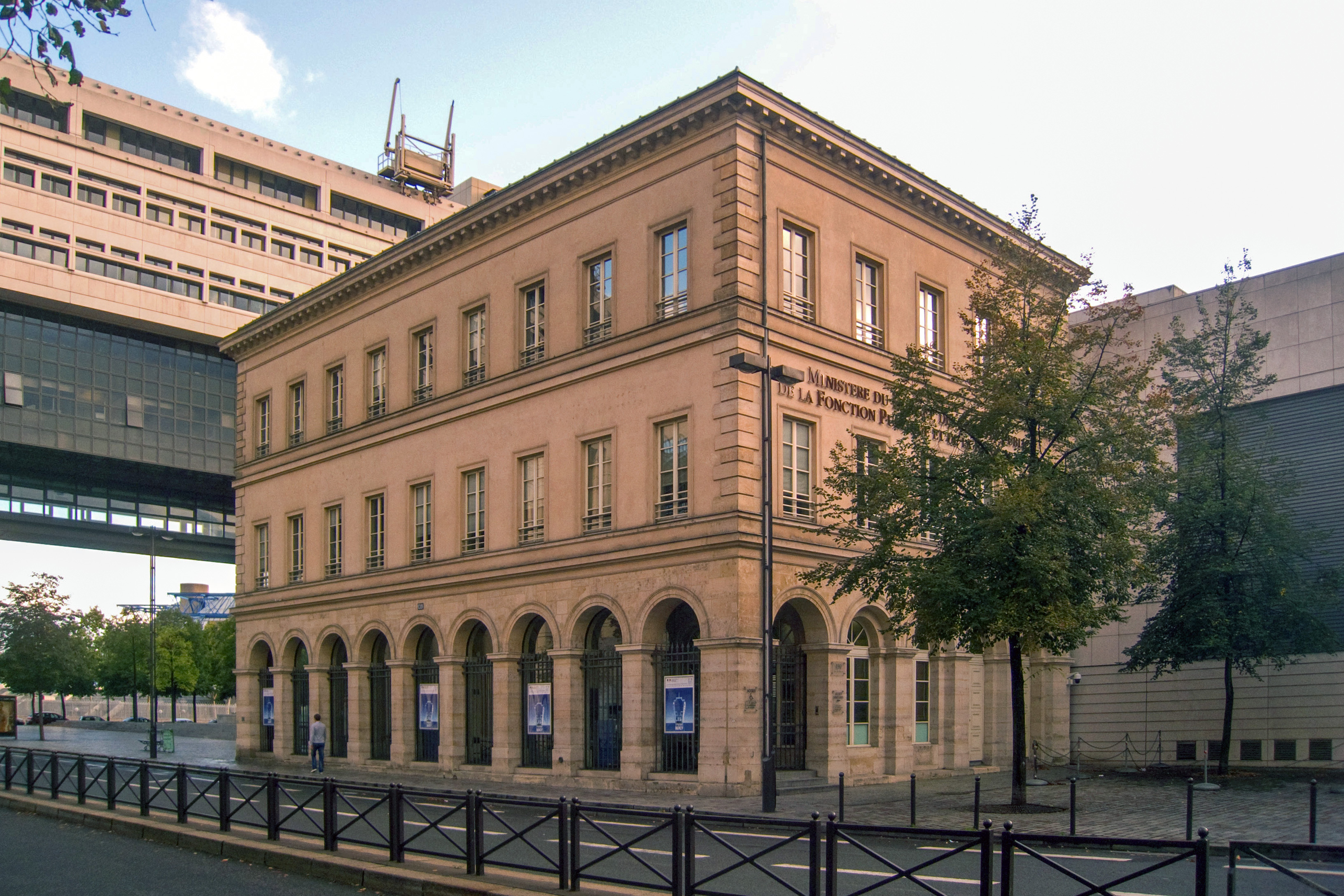
The pavillon de l'Ancienne-Douane, turned into the main entrance and postal address.

The project was contested by Jean Nouvel in 1984 in L'Architecture d'aujourd'hui. It was not well received by some at the ministry, both due to the modern architecture of the new headquarters and because the area was deemed peripheral by comparison with the main government institutions and offices. Édouard Balladur, who was the main minister in the cohabitation government opposed to Mitterrand, delayed construction for a time when he took office in 1986, and although his predecessor had moved to another government house, hôtel de Roquelaure, he had the prior offices restored at the Louvre and settled there despite the ongoing work for the Grand Louvre, refusing to move to Bercy in 1988. Although Jacques Chirac, the mayor of Paris, was Mitterrand's main opponent in the 1980s, he supported the move, as his urban planners argued for the development of the East of the city. Michel Charasse, who served as budget minister in the left-wing government formed after Mitterrand's re-election, obtained to take the Empire style furniture of his office to Bercy, where it is still used by his successors, contrasting with the modern furniture used everywhere else.

The completed parts of the complex were gradually occupied from the second half of 1986 until late 1989, starting with the Turgot and Sully buildings (called E and D at the time), followed by the Necker and Vauban buildings (C and B) in 1988, ending with the Colbert building (A) in 1989. Pierre Bérégovoy and his junior ministers moved from Rivoli to Bercy on 25 June 1989, and took their permanent offices in January of the next year.

Chemetov and Huidobro donated the project papers, for a total of 170 linear metres, to the departmental archives in 2016.

== Architecture ==
=== Style and features ===
Although an office building had been commissioned, the architects said they designed it as a republican palace, symbolizing both the power of government and its openness to the city and citizens. Some critics have compared it to Stalinist architecture.

The complex, in which about 6,000 employees work in 225,000 m^{2}, has 42 km of corridors, 8,500 doors, and 90 elevators. A degree of harmony is provided by the extensive use of a 90 cm square or cubic building module, down to internal and external decoration: each storey has a height of four modules (3,60 m), and each room as a floor-to-ceiling height of three modules (2,70 m); offices and conference rooms are formed by movable panels following the 90 cm modules, and can be reconfigured as the internal organisation evolves.

As typical of postmodernism, it includes elements from the architecture of previous centuries: the general shape of the Colbert building is inspired by a viaduct, and it is flanked by a (dry) moat, over which a small bridge leads to the ceremonial gate. Its larger arches, which include offices, remind of the old bridges of Paris, which were originally inhabited. Pierre Bérégovoy Hall, a 140 m long and 3,60 m large corridor conceived by Guy de Rougemont and leading to the ministerial offices, has columns and a floor decorated with 28 types of marble, reminding of Italian Renaissance architecture; it includes a multicoloured “ribbon” that follows simple geometric shapes, and intentionally includes an oblique shape in order to extend the space horizon in the hallway.

In particular, there are references to the Louvre Palace: the Colbert building is about as long as the facade of the department's former offices on rue de Rivoli; the courtyard of honour is square, like the cour Carrée; and the inner courtyards of the Vauban building remind of those of the Louvre.

=== Layout ===
Bercy is a complex of several buildings; the main lot, covering 3,5 ha, has a general "T" shape, with the northern end however expanding westwards over 750 m. The architects were required to envision a link between the gare de Lyon, to the north of the lot, and the river Seine to the south. The Turgot, Sully and (partially) Necker are built over the concrete slab which runs between the station and the rue de Bercy.

Paul Chemetov noted that it is the only major public building perpendicular to the Seine, since others (Louvre, musée d'Orsay, palais de Chaillot etc.) are parallel to the river.

Turgot building Sully building Necker building Pavillon de l'Ancienne-Douane Colbert building Vauban building Pierre Mendès France Convention Centre Pavillon de la Barrière-d'Eau

=== Facilities ===
In addition to offices and conference rooms, the complex is a "city within the city" with five restaurants, three cafeterias, a post office, a documentation centre, a nursery, and a gym.

A piece of well-known equipment is Télédoc, an automated mail delivery system which circulates 445 miniature carts between 122 "stations", which was maintained even after the digitization of much of internal communication and still carried five tons of paper every day as of the 2010s.

== Buildings ==
=== Pavillon de l'Ancienne-Douane ===
The pavillon de l'Ancienne-Douane (Former Customs Pavilion) is a pre-existing three-storey building, protected since 1962, which served as the main public entrance to the complex, and as its postal address (139, rue de Bercy). It is close to the location of the former barrière de Bercy (of barrière des Poules), a toll gate of the Wall of the Ferme générale (1780s–1860).

=== Colbert building ===
The Colbert building (bâtiment Colbert) is the main axis of the entire complex, north–south along boulevard de Bercy, following the former wall and reaching the northern end of the pont de Bercy. It is named after Jean-Baptiste Colbert, who was controller general of finances (forerunner to the present minister) under Louis XIV.

The layout is inspired by a viaduct, and it is in fact parallel to the viaduct over which Métro line 6 runs on the boulevard. It is 357 m long, with 32 m-wide arches in its central part, and two 72 m-wide ones spanning over rue de Bercy to the north and over quai de la Rapée to the south, plunging into the river Seine. The two larger arches were designed to serve as monumental eastern entry gates to the city, and echo the Grande Arche built as part of the Grands Travaux to the west of the city.

To the east of the building across boulevard de Bercy is a dry moat, used for a sculpture garden.

The river end serves as a small port, where two fast boats dedicated to VIP transportation are moored. A round heliport was also built on the roof, near the Ministers House, but is no longer used.

==== Ministers House ====
One section in the southern part of the Colbert building is the Ministers House (hôtel des ministres), a black nine-storey cube where the ministers and their private offices work. It has a 12° tilt from the rest of the building, aligned towards Notre-Dame Cathedral to the west.

The office of the most senior minister is on the 6th floor, and that of the budget minister is on the 5th floor. There has occasionally been disputes between new ministers for the largest or highest-located offices, especially when the ministry was split into several standalone departments.

At the ground lever is the building's ceremonial gate, a 7 m square sculpted in bronze by Georges Jeanclos and weighing 5 tons. It is accessed from boulevard de Bercy by a small bridge spanning over the moat; however, it is only opened for official visits, as well as for European Heritage Days.

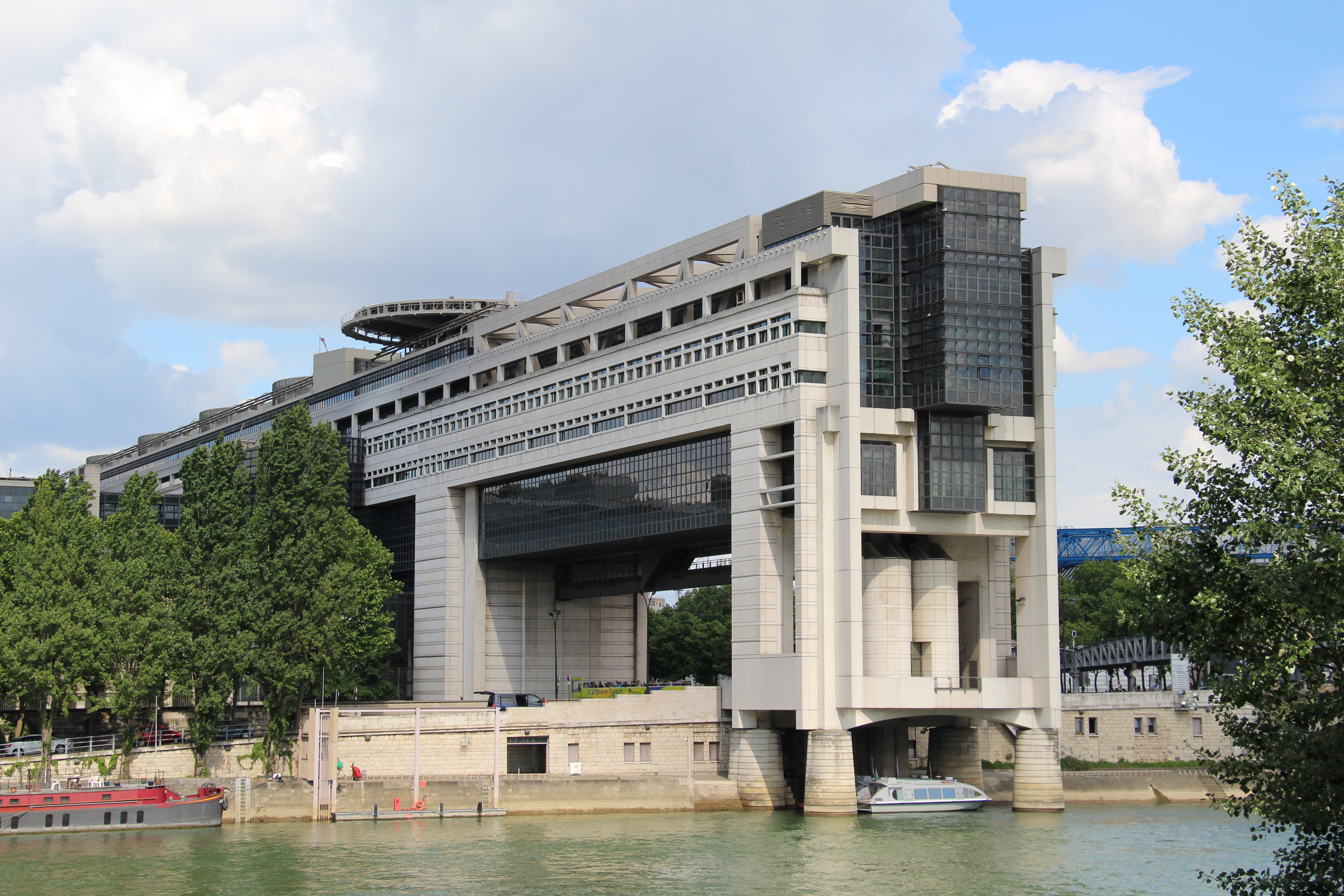
The southern arch of the Colbert building, plunging into the Seine.

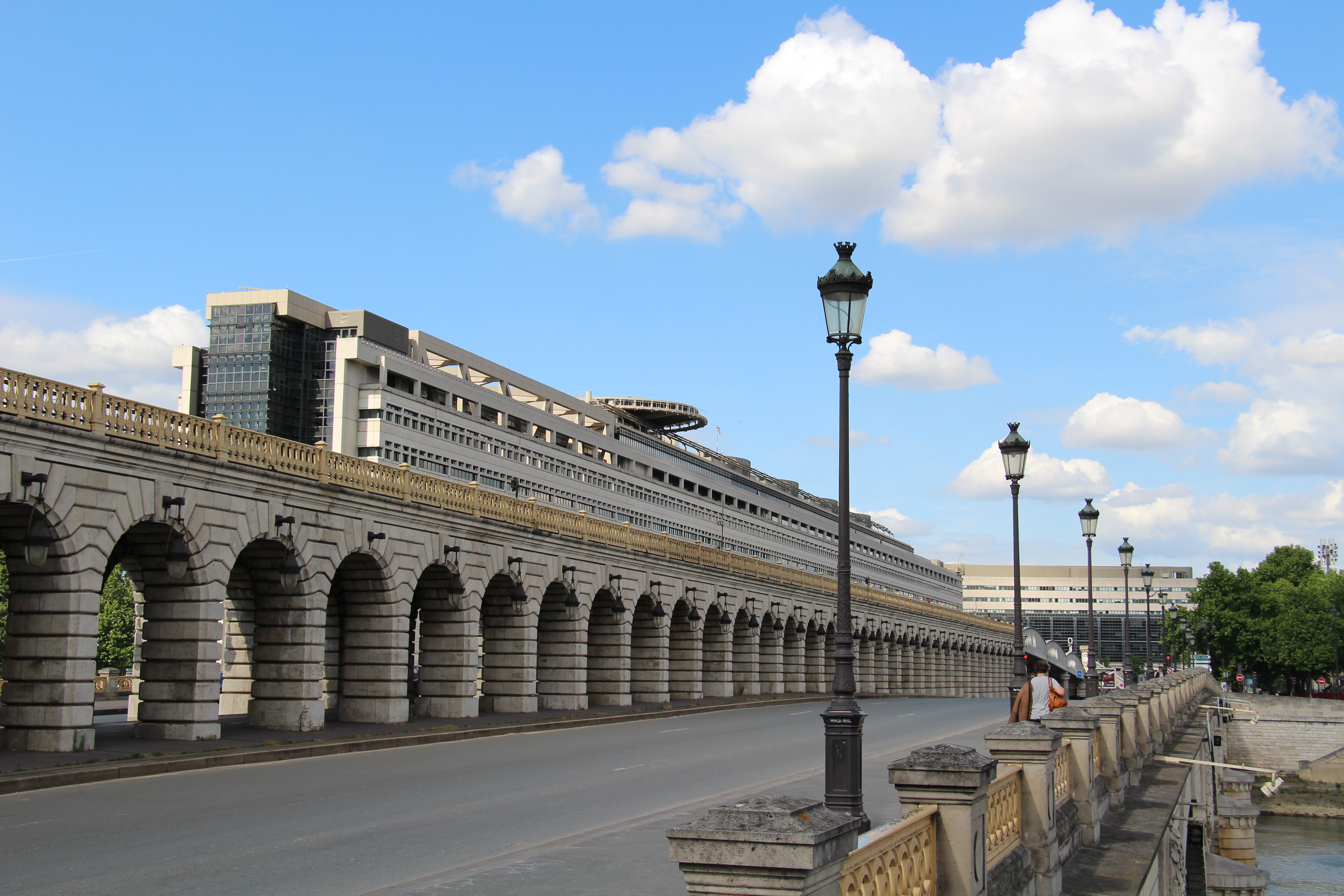
The Metro line 6 viaduct over pont de Bercy and the Colbert building in perspective from the opposite bank.

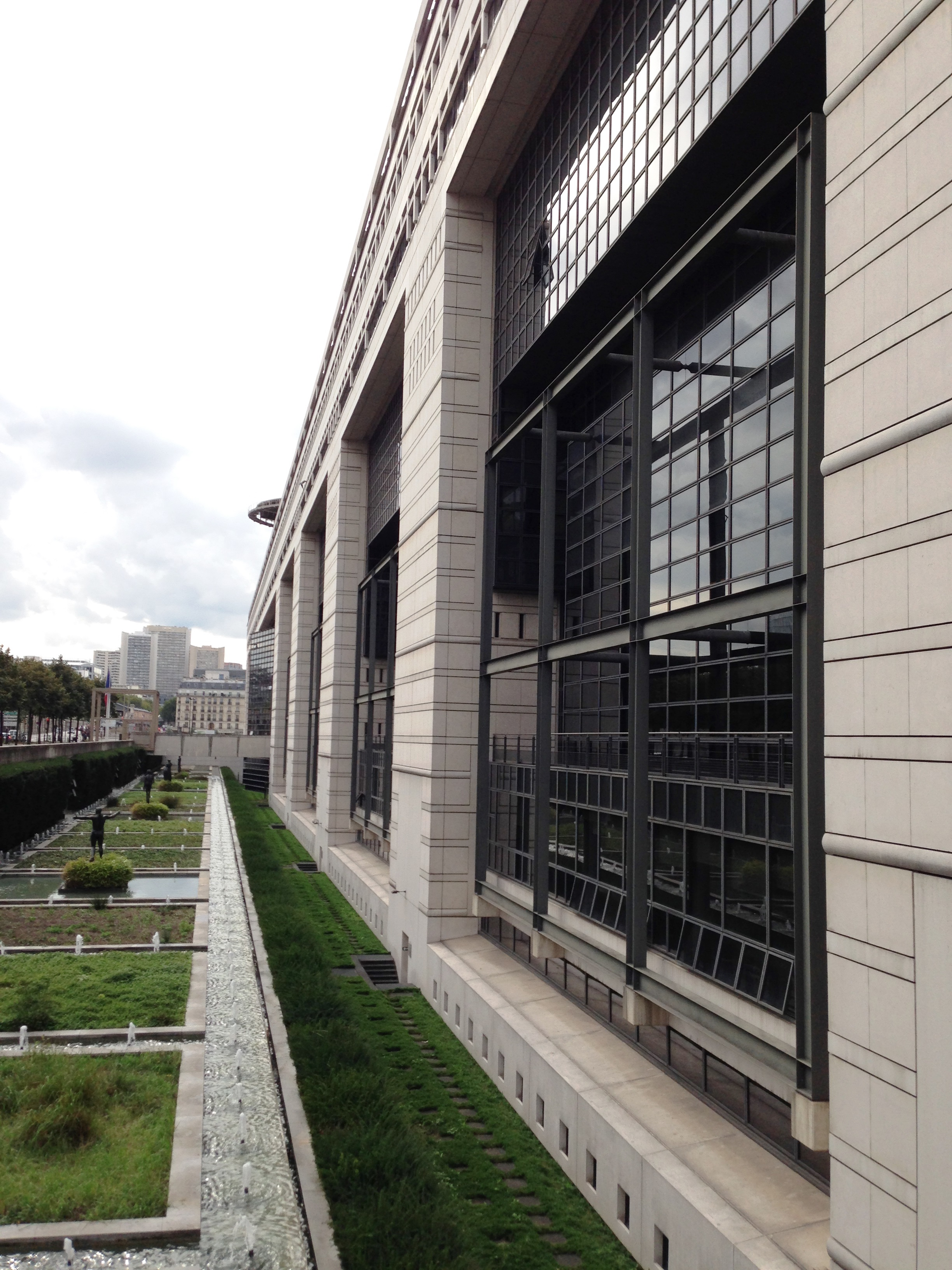
The moat and sculpture garden along the Colbert building.

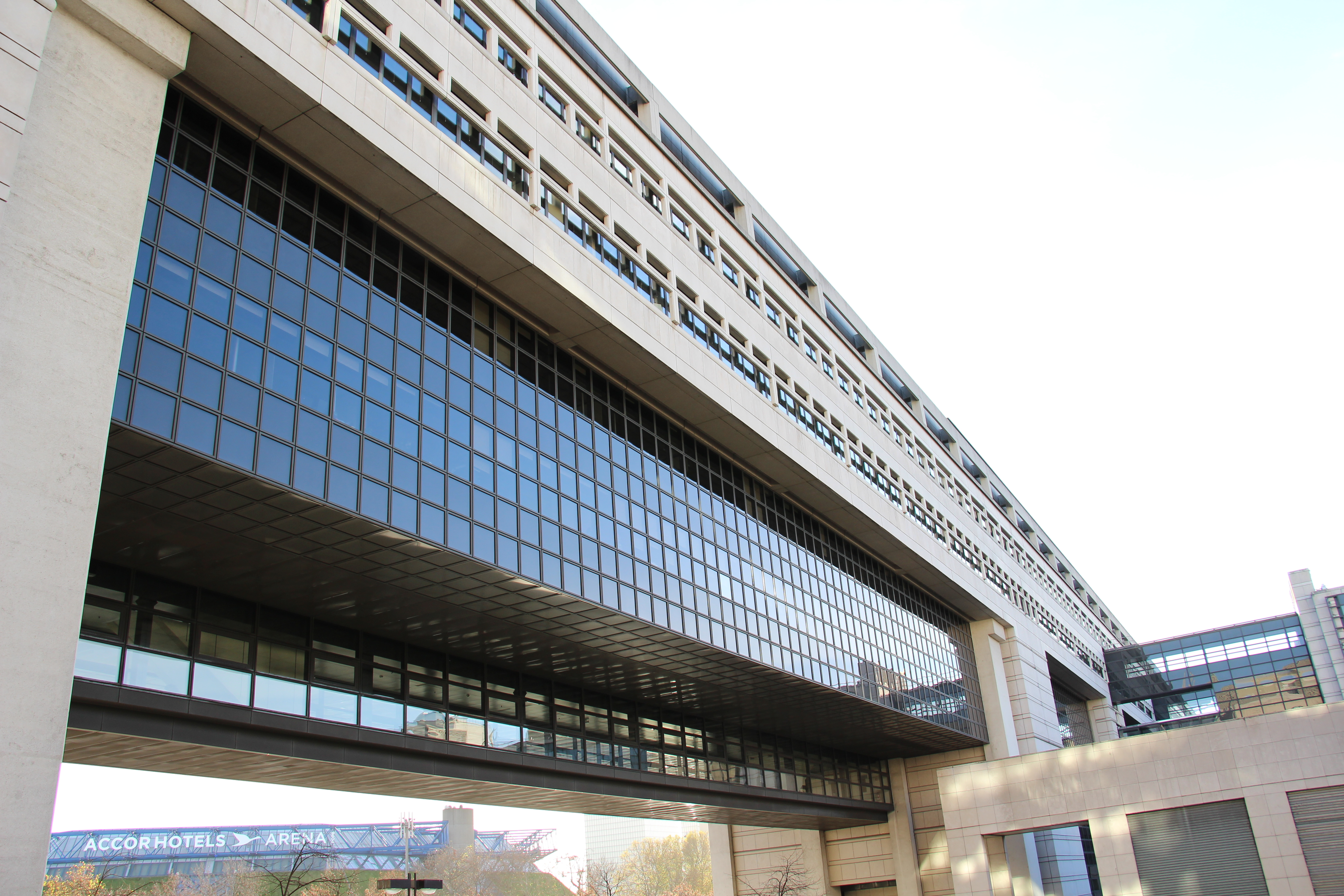
The northern arch over rue de Bercy.

=== Pavillon de la Barrière-d'Eau ===
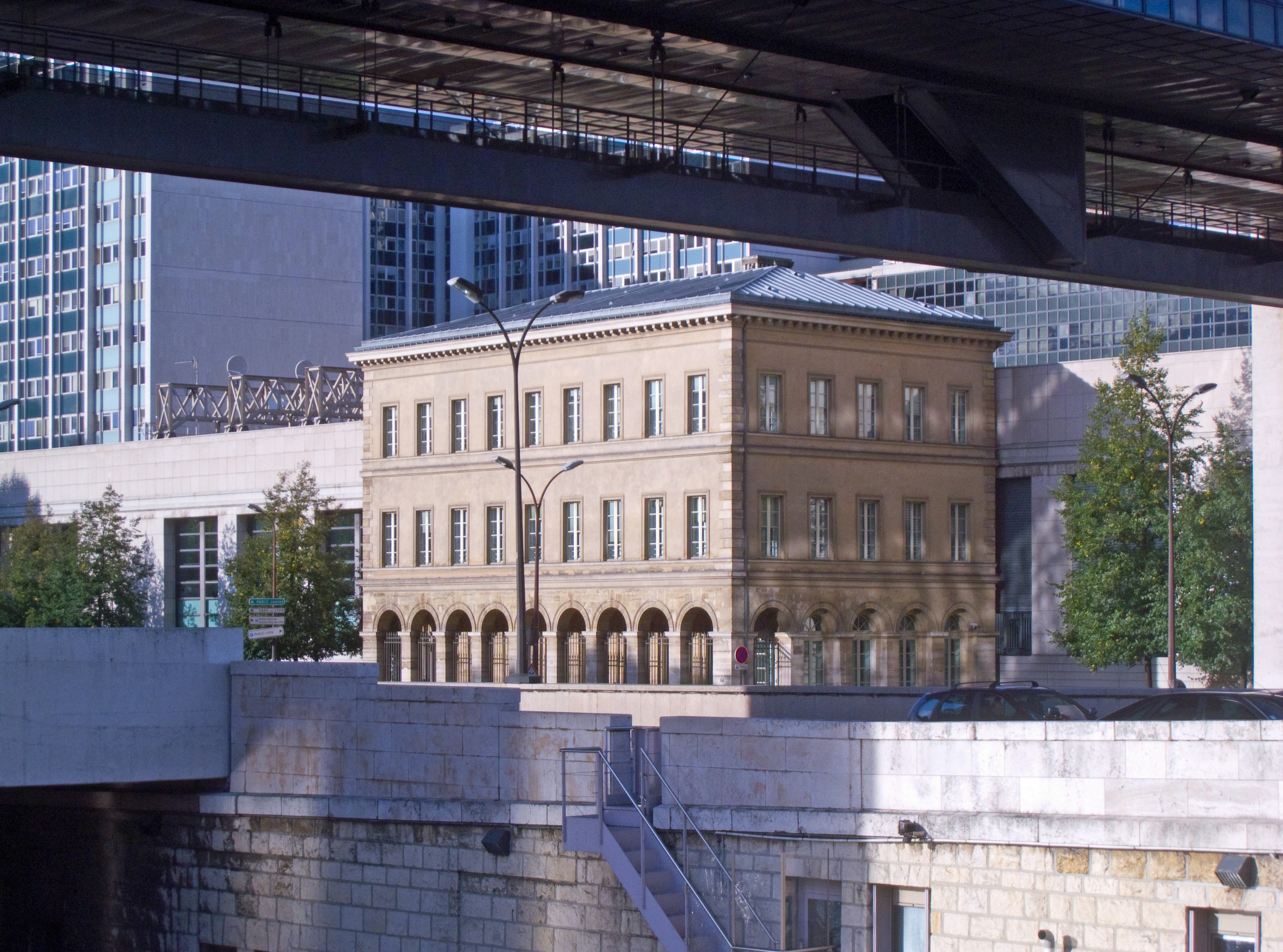
The pavillon de la Barrière-d'Eau, a 19th-century building included in the complex.

The pavillon de la Barrière d'Eau ("Water Gate Pavilion") is identical to the pavillon de l'Ancienne-Douane. It is close to the location of the former barrière de la Rapée, the remnants of which were demolished in the 1980s.

=== Pierre Mendès France Convention Centre ===
The Pierre Mendès France Convention Centre (centre de conférences Pierre-Mendès-France) is a detached convention venue, also used by other departments. It is named after Pierre Mendès France, who was prime minister during the Fourth Republic and had also served as minister of the national economy at the Liberation.

=== Vauban building ===
The Vauban building (bâtiment Vauban) is to the west of the Colbert building in the main lot. It is named after Vauban, who was commissioner general for fortifications to Louis XIV, and although, he never served as a minister, is considered one of the greatest military engineers in French history.

It is laid out as a grid around six inner courtyards.

=== Necker building ===
The Necker building (bâtiment Necker) is to the northern end of the complex, reached by the Colbert building by its main northern arch over rue de Bercy. It is named after Jacques Necker, who was controller general of finances under Louis XVI.

=== Sully building ===
The Sully building (bâtiment Sully) is one of the two northwestern buildings between rue de Bercy and the tracks of the gare de Lyon. It is named after Sully, who was superintendent of finances as well as chief minister to Henry IV.

=== Turgot building ===
The Turgot building (bâtiment Turgot) is the northwestern end of the complex, adjacent to the train station. It is named after Turgot, who was controller general of finances under Louis XVI.

== Exterior spaces ==
The main exterior spaces of the complex are to the west of the Colbert building, with two main alleys named after Paul Ramadier (allée Paul-Ramadier), the first prime minister of the Fourth Republic, and Jean Monnet (allée Jean-Monnet), one of the founding fathers of the European Union. Between the Ministers House (across the ceremonial gate on the eastern facade) and the convention centre is the Robert Schuman Courtyard of Honour (cour d'honneur Robert-Schuman), named after Robert Schuman, another EU founding father, and since 2008 decorated with the twelve stars of the flag of Europe.

The main lot (north to the left).

== Art ==
The building has over thirty works of art, worth over 4 million euros, including four monumental paintings by Roberto Matta, Pierre Alechinsky, Paul Rebeyrolle and Gérard Titus-Carmel in Pierre Bérégovoy Hall.

== Reception ==
The building was labeled Architecture contemporaine remarquable (ACR, "Remarkable Contemporary Architecture") in 2016 by the Ministry of Culture.

== See also ==
- Government of France § Ministries

== Sources ==
- Atelier de l'urbanisme et de l'architecture (September 2016). "Construire un palais de la République" (PDF) (in French). Paris.
- Avril, Jean-Baptiste (2017). Bercy. Ministère de l'Économie, des Finances et de l'Industrie (Photo-book) (in French). Paris: Alternatives. ISBN 978-2-86227-511-6.
- Guislain, Margot (9 August 2019). "Bercy, un palais de la République". Le Moniteur des travaux publics et du bâtiment (in French). No. 6042. Antony. pp. 22–25. ISSN 0026-9700.
- Mathiotte, Olivier; Noyer-Duplaix, Léo (2020). "Ministère de l'Économie et des Finances (ACR0000696)". Patrimoine architectural (Mérimée). Plateforme ouverte du patrimoine (POP) (Architecture contemporaine remarquable listing record) (in French). Paris: Ministry of Culture.
- Vidal, Guy (January–February 1984). "Le ministère des Finances à Bercy". La Revue administrative (in French) (217). Paris: 82–86. ISSN 0035-0672. JSTOR 40780956. — Vidal was the civil servant coordinating the project.
- Vidal, Guy (January–February 1990). "Le Ministère des Finances de Rivoli à Bercy". La Revue administrative (in French) (253). Paris: 71–77. ISSN 0035-0672. JSTOR 40782098.
- "Bercy : un bâtiment exemplaire". Gestion & Finances publiques (in French) (6–2019). Paris: 61–66. November–December 2019. doi:10.3166/gfp.2019.6.009. ISSN 1969-1009 – via Cairn.info.
