= Paul Chemetov =

French architect and urban planner (1928–2024)

- Born: 6 September 1928; Paris, France
- Died: 16 June 2024 (aged 95); Paris, France
- Education: École nationale supérieure des Beaux-Arts
- Occupation: Architect
- Awards: Grand prix national de l'architecture; Officer of the Legion of Honour; Ordre des Arts et des Lettres; Ordre national du Mérite
- Projects: Ministry of the Economy and Finance building, Paris; French Embassy in New Delhi; Arènes de Metz
- Design: Méridienne verte

Paul Chemetov (6 September 1928 – 16 June 2024) was a French architect and urbanist. He was best known for his collaborations with Borja Huidobro.

== Biography ==
Chemetov was born in Paris on 6 September 1928 to a Russian-born émigré father and Russian-Jewish mother. As a student, he belonged to the Union of Communist Students. He graduated from the National School of Fine Arts in 1959. Chemetov taught at the École des Ponts ParisTech until 1989, at which time he switched to the École Polytechnique Fédérale de Lausanne. In 1961, he joined the AAU. He designed several buildings with Borja Huidobro (b. 1936, Santiago, Chile) beginning in 1983. Chemetov received several awards and honors including the Grand prix national de l'architecture (1980), Officer of the Legion of Honour, Officer of the Ordre des Arts et des Lettres, and Officer of the Ordre national du Mérite. Chemetov was the father of landscape architect Alexandre Chemetoff, who won the Grand Prix de l'urbanisme in 2000. He also had two daughters Marianne – who is married to famous cinematographer Darius Khondji – and Agnès Chemetoff.

Chemetov died in Paris on 16 June 2024, at the age of 95.

== Partial works ==
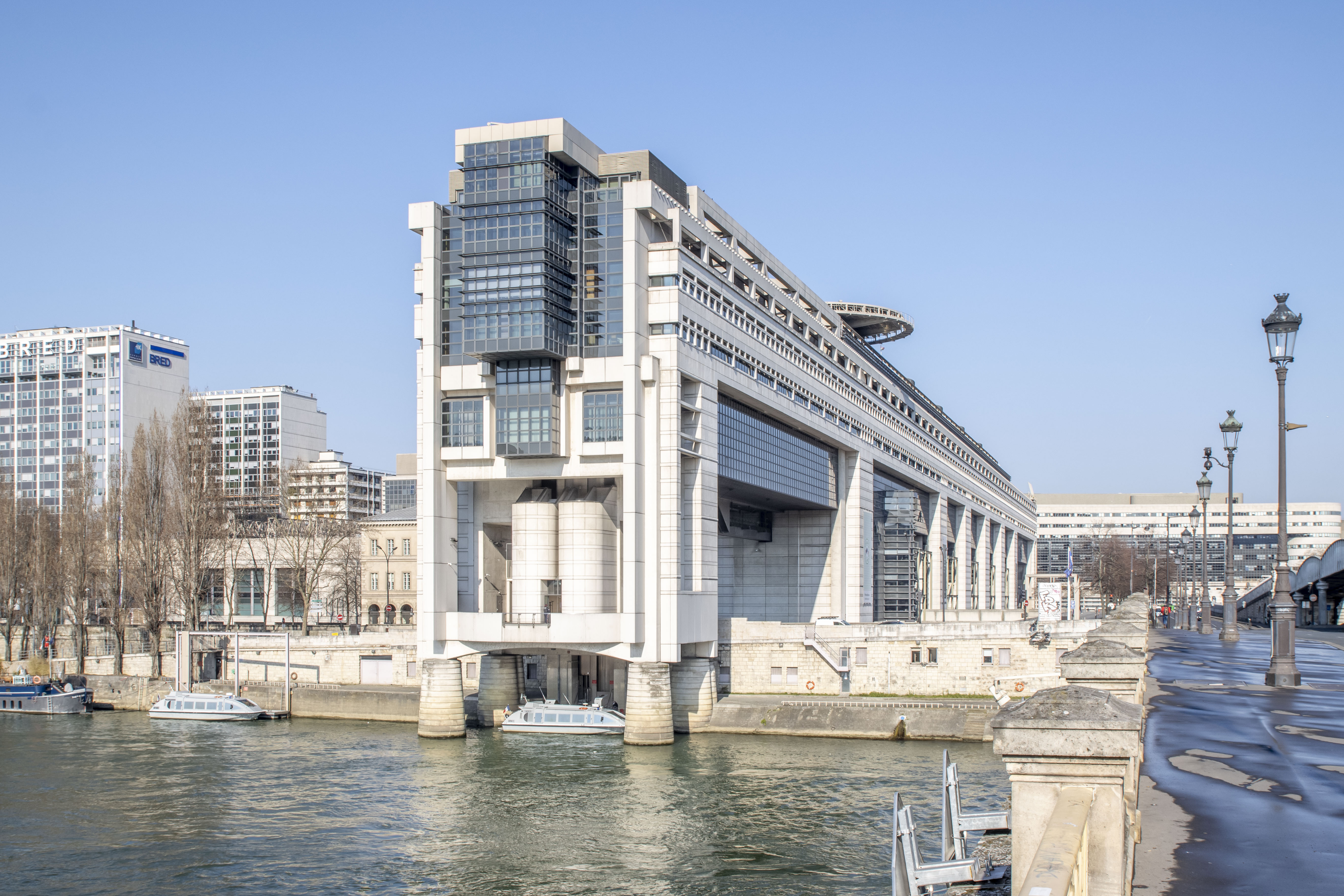
France's Ministry of the Economy and Finance building (March 2022).

In 1960–1964, Chemetov worked on a housing complex in Vigneux. From 1981 to 1988, he worked on the French Ministry of the Economy and Finance building, one of the Grands Projets of François Mitterrand, with Huidobro. From 1982 to 1985 he worked on the French Embassy in New Delhi, India, with Borja Huidobro and in December 1982 won the Ministry of Finances competition. In 1983, Chemetov designed the public housing building at 5, Promenade du Marquis de Rays, Canal District in Courcouronnes (Essonne). In 1988 he designed the Fontaines du Ministère in Paris and from 1989 to 1994 was responsible for the renovation of the main gallery of the evolution of the National Museum of Natural History, with Huidobro. In 1992 Chemetov was responsible for the development of a tram from Bobigny to Saint-Denis and in 1994 worked on the library-media center at Évreux, with Huidobro. In 1999 he designed the Méridienne verte, in 2000 he designed the public library at Montpellier, with Huidobro and in 2001 designed the Arènes de Metz, with Huidobro. In 2001 he worked on the public library at Châlons-en-Champagne.
