= Paola Viganò =

Italian architect

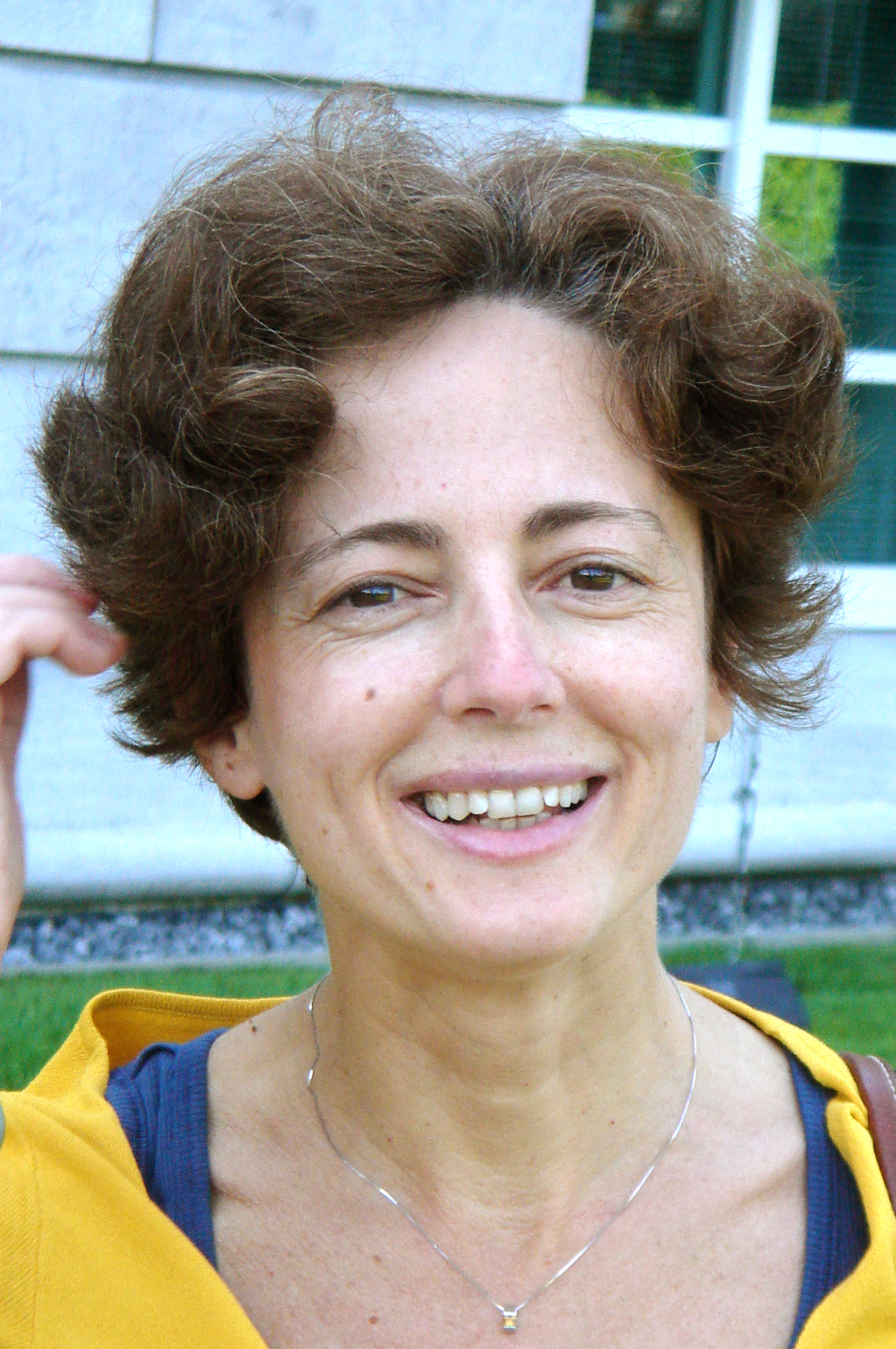
- Viganò in 2008
- Born: 29 May 1961 (age 64); Sondrio, Lombardy, Italy
- Occupation: Architect
- Awards: Grand Prix de l'urbanisme (2013); Gold Medal for Italian Architecture (2018); Schelling Architectural Theory Price (2022)
- Practice: Studio (formerly with Bernardo Secchi)
- Projects: Grand Paris
- Website: www.studiopaolavigano.eu

Paola Viganò (born 29 May 1961) is an Italian architect and urbanist, currently professor at École Polytechnique Fédérale de Lausanne (EPFL) and at the University of Venice (IUAV).

== Career ==
Viganò received a PhD in architectural composition from the University of Venice (IUAV) in 1994. In 1998, she was named associate professor of urbanism at the Polytechnic University of Bari. She then moved back to the University of Venice (IUAV) in 2000 as an associate professor, where she was promoted to full professor in 2011. In 2013, she was named full professor in Urban Theory and Urban Design at École Polytechnique Fédérale de Lausanne (EPFL), where she was at the Habitat Research Center since 2016.

== Research ==
Viganò leads the laboratory of Urbanism (Lab-U) at EPFL. Her research focuses on the study of new forms of urbanization and explores the concept of cities as renewable resources. She analyzes the concept of horizontal metropolis as a vision for planetary urbanization. The Lab-U also explores the consequences on the urban space of complete abolition of individual cars, as well as ecological challenges linked to the expansion of urban spaces. Together with Bernardo Secchi, she is known for having put to the fore the concept of 'diffuse city'.

== Projects & achievements ==
Viganò founded the architectural study Studio with Bernardo Secchi in 1990. Together, they participated in the elaboration of the urban master plans of many European cities (Bergamo, Siena, Antwerp, etc.), participated in the Lille 2030 and Montpellier 2040 projects and more recently to that of Grand Paris and the center of Brest metropolitan area.

In 2013, Viganò was awarded with the French Grand Prix de l'Urbanisme. She received the International Batibouw Award in 2015, the Ultima Architecture Flemish Culture Prize in 2016 and a Gold Medal for Italian Architecture for her career in 2018.

In 2016, she received a Doctor Honoris Causa degree from KU Leuven.

In 2022, the Schelling Architecture Foundation has selected Paola Viganò as the winner of the 2022 Schelling Award for Architectural Theory. “Paola Viganò is one of the key voices in the European debate on pressing issues of today’s urban development – questions that she addresses in her theoretical writings, but also gives answers to as a practical planner,” notes the Foundation on its website.

== Notable books ==
- Secchi, B. and Viganò, P. La Ville poreuse. Un projet pour le grand Paris et la métropole de l'après-Kyoto, Genève, Suisse, MétisPresses, coll. « vuesdensemble », 2011. 2011, 256 p. ISBN 978-2-940406-56-2
- Viganò, P. Territorialism, Cambridge, MA: Harvard University Graduate School of Design, 2014.
- Viganò, P., Secchi, B., and Fabian, L. (eds) (2016) Water and Asphalt. The Project of Isotropy, Zurich: Park Books.
- Viganò, P., Barcelloni Corte, M., and Cavalieri, C. (eds) (2018) The Horizontal Metropolis Between Urbanism and Urbanization, Zurich: Springer.
- Viganò, P. La città elementare, Genève, Suisse, Éditions Skira, coll. « Biblioteca di architettura », 1999, 208 p. ISBN 888118642X
- Viganò, P. Territori della nuova modernità/Territories of a New Modenity, Napoli, Electa, 2001.
- Viganò, P. ‹ The porous city ›, in Pellegrini P., Viganò P., eds., Comment vivre ensemble, Q3, Officina Edizioni, Roma, 2006.
- Viganò, P. and Secchi, B. Antwerp - Territory of a New Modernity, Pompano Beach, (FL), USA, Sun Publishers, coll. « Explorations », 2009, 248 p. ISBN 9789085067788
- Viganò, P. Les Territoires de l’urbanisme. Le Projet comme producteur de connaissance [« I territori dell'urbanistica : il progetto come produttore di conoscenza »], trad. de Anne Grillet-Aubert, Genève, Suisse, MētisPresses, coll. « vuesdensemble », 2014, 239 p. ISBN 978-2-940406-88-3
