= Alexandre Chemetoff =

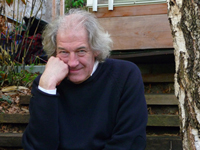
Alexandre Chemetoff, 2010.

Alexandre Chemetoff (born 1950) is a French architect, urban planner and landscape artist. In 2000, he was awarded the Grand Prix de l'urbanisme. His approach to project development is to visit the site, walk it, and then connect it with other experiences.

== Early years ==
Born in Paris, Chemetoff is the son of Paul Chemetov (of Russian and Russian-Jewish descent) winner of the Grand prix national de l'architecture. He graduated from the L'École Nationale Supérieure d'Horticulture in Versailles. He states his career inspirations came from visits to his father's building sites, and meeting Michel Corajoud, a contemporary French landscape architect.

== Career ==
Chemetoff's practice is characterized as being open and free, refusing limits and boundaries between disciplines. His considers his practice of the profession as a commitment in the world. In 1983, he founded the Bureau of Landscapes, an organization consisting of architects, landscape architects and urban planners. He established Alexander Chemetoff & Associates in 2002, which directs, coordinates and leads the activities of various offices the includes forty people in Gentilly, Nantes, and Nancy. He runs the business with his two partners, Hanaïzi Malika (Trustee) and Patrick Henry (architect).

"There is no point in designing a detail that acts counter to the totality." (A. Chemetoff, 1989)

His projects are coordinated with a multidisciplinary approach, combining architecture, construction, urban planning, landscape and public spaces. They include urban projects such as the creation of the city center of Boulogne-Billancourt (1996–2001), the metamorphosis of the island of Nantes (2000–2010), the plateau in Nancy (2004), and the Plaine Achille in Saint-Étienne (2009). Some of his commercial projects are the Two Banks of Nancy (2002–2008), a residential block in Paris at the corner of Rue Bichat and the Rue du Temple (2009), a garden city, La Rivière, in Blanquefort (2006), library at Vauhallan (2000–2002), a sports stadium in La Courneuve (2004–2006), and the commercial center of the Champ de March in Angoulême (2003–2007). His parks and public development can be found at Meurthe in Nancy (1989) and the Paul Mistral Park in Grenoble (2004–2008). Chemetoff received international notice for his parks in Villejuif, and in Paris, "Jardin de Bambou" (Bamboo Garden) at the Parc de la Villette.
