= Grands Projets of François Mitterrand =

Eight monumental structures in Paris, built in the 1980s-90s

The Grands Projets of François Mitterrand (variants: Grands Travaux (Note: [ɡʁɑ̃ tʁavo]) or Grands Projets Culturels (Note: [ɡʁɑ̃ pʁɔʒɛ kyltyʁɛl]); officially: Grandes Opérations d'Architecture et d'Urbanisme (Note: [ɡʁɑ̃dz‿ɔpeʁasjɔ̃ daʁʃitɛktyʁ e dyʁbanism])) was an architectural programme to provide modern monuments in Paris, the city of monuments, symbolising France's role in art, politics and the economy at the end of the 20th century. The programme was initiated by François Mitterrand, the President of France, during his two terms in office (1981-1995). Mitterrand viewed the civic building projects, estimated at the time to cost the Government of France 15.7 billion francs, both as a revitalisation of the city, as well as contemporary architecture promoted by Socialist Party politics. The scale of the project and its ambitious nature was compared to the major building schemes of Louis XIV.

This grandiose plan, commencing in 1982, was termed as a "testament to political symbolism and process" launched in the post-World War II France, as an exercise in urban planning. The Grands Projets, described as "eight monumental building projects that in two decades transformed the city skyline", included the Louvre Pyramid, Musée d'Orsay, Parc de la Villette, Arab World Institute, Opéra Bastille, Grande Arche de La Défense, Ministry of the Economy and Finance building, and a new campus for the Bibliothèque nationale de France, the last and most expensive of the group. The projects did not all begin under Mitterrand—the Musée d'Orsay, La Défense Arch, Arab World Institute and La Villette commenced under his predecessor, President Valéry Giscard d'Estaing—but they are attributed to Mitterrand as they radically changed form under him.

== History ==
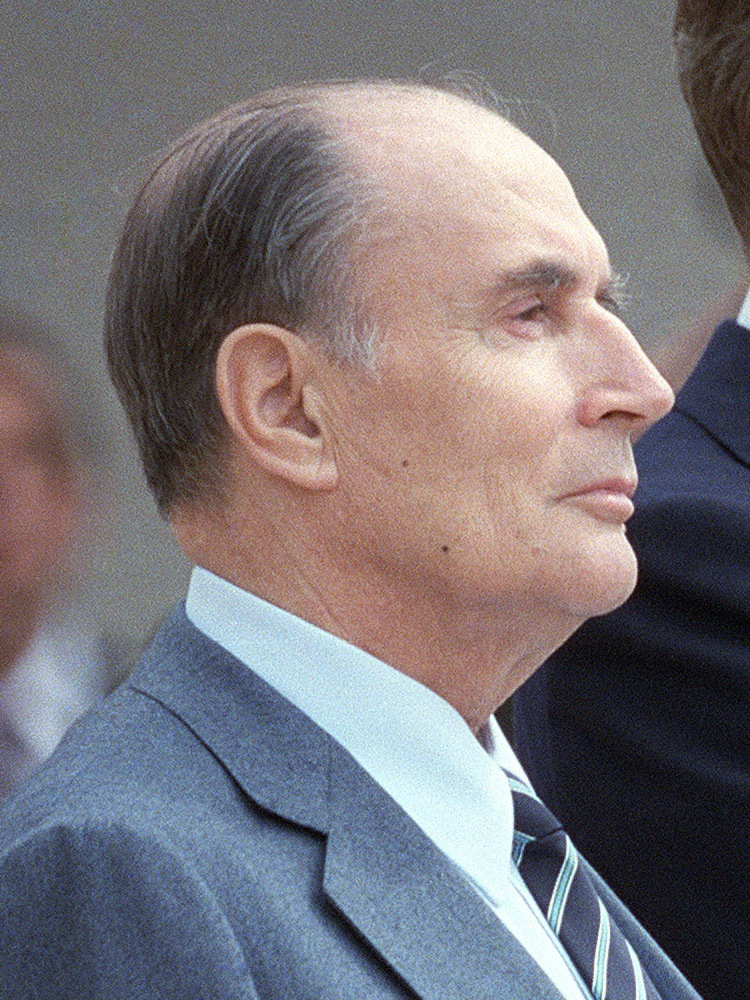
Mitterrand in 1984 at a time when the project was at its peak

Built between 1981 and 1998, the Grands Projets were constructed of similar materials, in less than two decades, within an urban landscape, and displaying related ideologies. Several of the monuments would display transparency, reflection, and abstract form. Considered to be visible, durable and controversial elements of Mitterrand's years in office, the Grands Travaux (or Grands Projets Culturels) were officially known as the Grandes Operations d'Architecture et d'Urbanisme.

François Mitterrand's Socialist government of the 1980s was strongly focused on promoting culture, and it was one of the centerpieces of his presidency. Mitterrand's government allocated more money into art than had ever been seen in the past or since. They were commissioned to celebrate the 200th anniversary of the French Revolution.

Mitterrand drew his inspiration for the Grands Projets from President Valéry Giscard d'Estaing's Centre Georges Pompidou of the late 1970s. The Centre Georges Pompidou was the result of an architectural design competition in 1971 which selected a team comprising Italian architect Renzo Piano, the British architect couple Richard Rogers and Su Rogers, Gianfranco Franchini, the British structural engineer Edmund Happold (who would later found Buro Happold), and Irish structural engineer Peter Rice.

Reporting on Rogers' winning the Pritzker Prize in 2007, The New York Times noted that the design of the Centre "turned the architecture world upside down". The Pritzker jury said the Pompidou "revolutionized museums, transforming what had once been elite monuments into popular places of social and cultural exchange, woven into the heart of the city." Mitterrand, seeing the passion that went into the building project and having a will to produce the best possible buildings, pursued his Grands Projets based on similar architectural competitions which would attract architects from a wide field to develop the city to its architectural potential.

== Chronology ==
Mitterrand's Grands Projets were realized throughout his presidencies:

- 10 May 1981: François Mitterrand is elected president
- 24 September 1981: Press conference presenting the scope of the Grands Projets
- 25 January 1985: Inauguration of the Grande Halle of the Parc de la Villette
- 1 December 1986: Inauguration of the musée d'Orsay
- 30 November 1987: Inauguration of the Arab World Institute
- 4 March 1988: Inauguration of the Louvre Pyramid
- 8 May 1988 : François Mitterrand is reelected for a second term
- 13 July 1989: Inauguration of Opéra Bastille
- 26 August 1989: Inauguration of the Grande Arche de La Défense
- 6 May 1994: Inauguration of the Channel Tunnel
- 30 March 1995: Inauguration of the Bibliothèque nationale de France

== Influenced ==
=== Musée d'Orsay ===
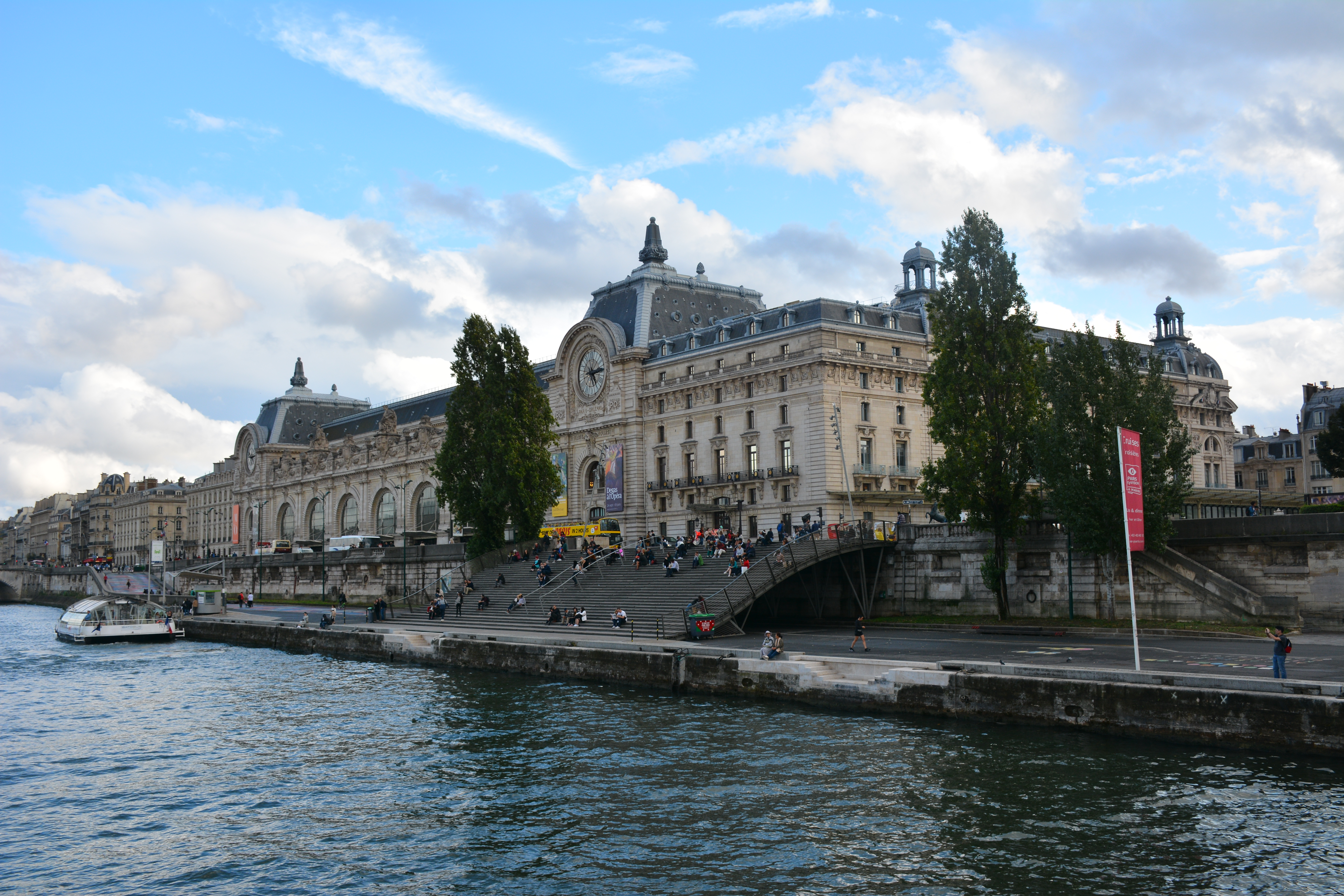
The museum of Musée d'Orsay from the right bank of Seine River

In 1977, the government made the decision to renovate the Gare d'Orsay (Orsay train station) into the Musée d'Orsay. The Italian architect Gae Aulenti oversaw the design of the conversion from 1980 to 1986. The work involved creating 20,000 square metres (220,000 sq ft) of new floorspace on four floors. The new museum was opened by Mitterrand on 1 December 1986, and even though it began before he took office, the work is attributed as one of his Grands Projets.

=== Parc de la Villette ===
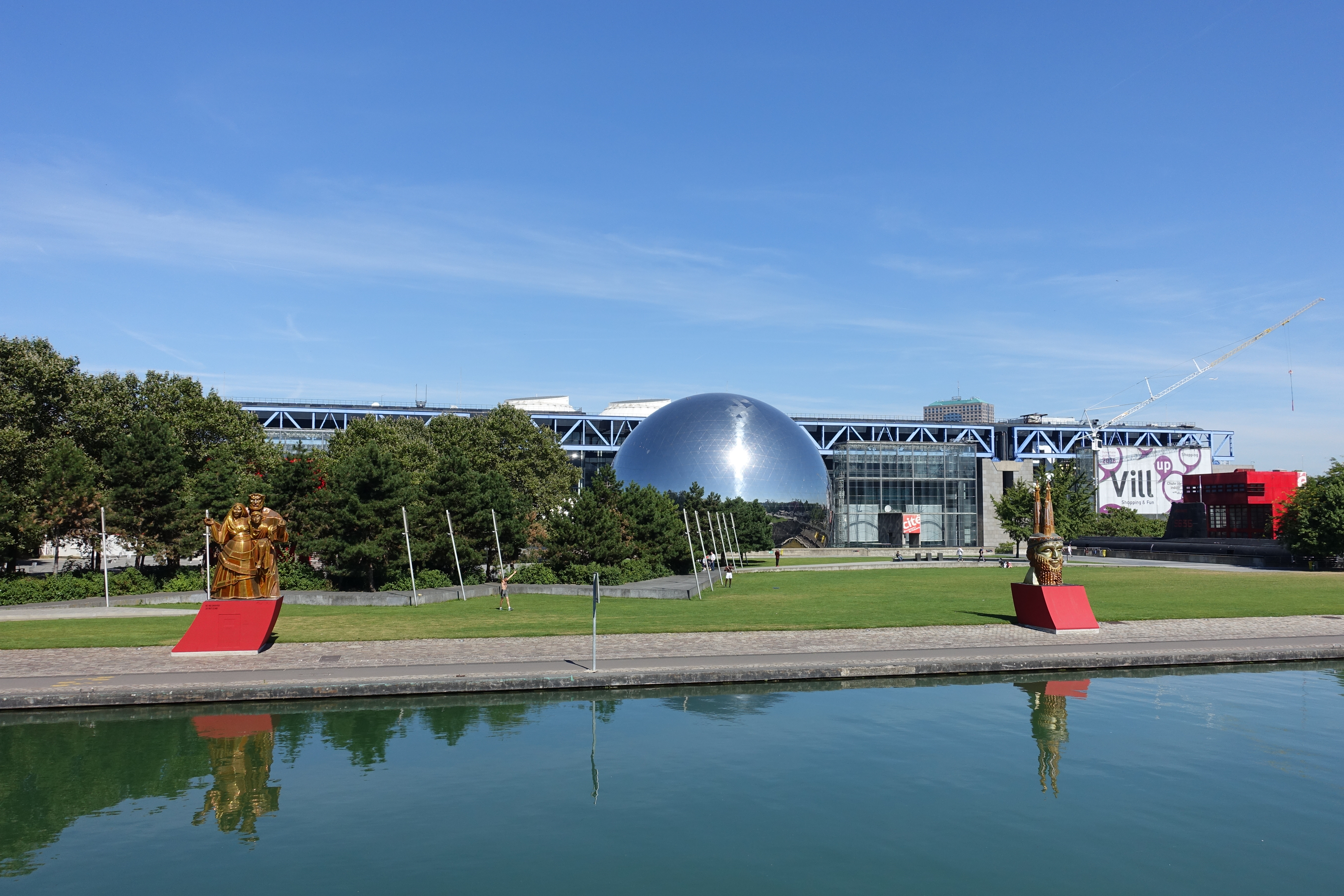
Parc de la Villette with the Cité des Sciences and the Géode in the background

Parc de la Villette, located in northeastern Paris, now includes a science museum and an exhibition hall. A project titled "Parc de la Villette" was launched in 1979 to create a national park with a music centre and a museum devoted to science and technology. The project is spread over an area of 55 acres (22 ha). In an international competition held in 1982 in which 460 teams from 41 countries participated, Bernard Tschumi, a French architect of Swiss origin, was chosen as the architect to build the complex, in March 1983.

The objective was to make Parc de la Villette an artistic, cultural and popular centre in Paris. Tschumi designed the park from 1984 to 1987 on the site of the former Parisian abattoirs, which had been built in 1867 by Napoleon III and demolished and relocated in 1974. The park project was successfully completed in stages with the gardens of the Park and the Maison de la Villette getting established in October 1987, the Music and Dance centres in 1990, Music and Concert Halls inaugurated in January 1995 and Music Museum inaugurated in January 2000. It now hosts the annual Open-Air Film Festival.

=== Grande Arche de La Défense ===
The Grande Arche de La Défense in the business district of La Défense, west of Paris

Grande Arche de La Défense, the Great Arch of La Défense, is a monumental building located at the northern terminus of the Grand Louvre–Place de la Concorde–Champs-Elysées–Arc de Triomphe axis. The name is derived from the La Défense de Paris monument which was built in 1870 as a commemorative building to mark the 1870 War. It was planned to be built on a flat plain land across the Seine River from the Bois de Boulogne.

A great national design competition involving some 400 entrants was launched in 1982 under the initiative of Mitterrand to design the Grande Arche de La Défense. Danish architect Johan Otto von Spreckelsen (1929–1987) and Danish engineer Erik Reitzel designed the winning entry to be a 20th-century version of the Arc de Triomphe: a monument to humanity and humanitarian ideals rather than military victories. The construction of the monument began in 1985 and Mitterrand personally saw that the largest crane in Europe was brought in to build it.

Spreckelsen resigned in July 1986 and ratified the transfer of all his architectural responsibilities to his associate, French architect Paul Andreu. Reitzel continued his work until the monument was completed in 1989. The Arche is almost a perfect cube (width: 108 metres (354 ft), height: 110 metres (360 ft), depth: 112 metres (367 ft)). It has been suggested that the structure looks like a four-dimensional hypercube (a tesseract) projected onto the three-dimensional world. It has a prestressed concrete frame covered with glass and Carrara marble from Italy and was built by the French civil engineering company Bouygues. La Grande Arche was inaugurated on 14 July 1989, with grand military parades that marked the bicentennial of the French Revolution and completed the line of monuments that forms the Axe historique running through Paris.

== Commissioned ==
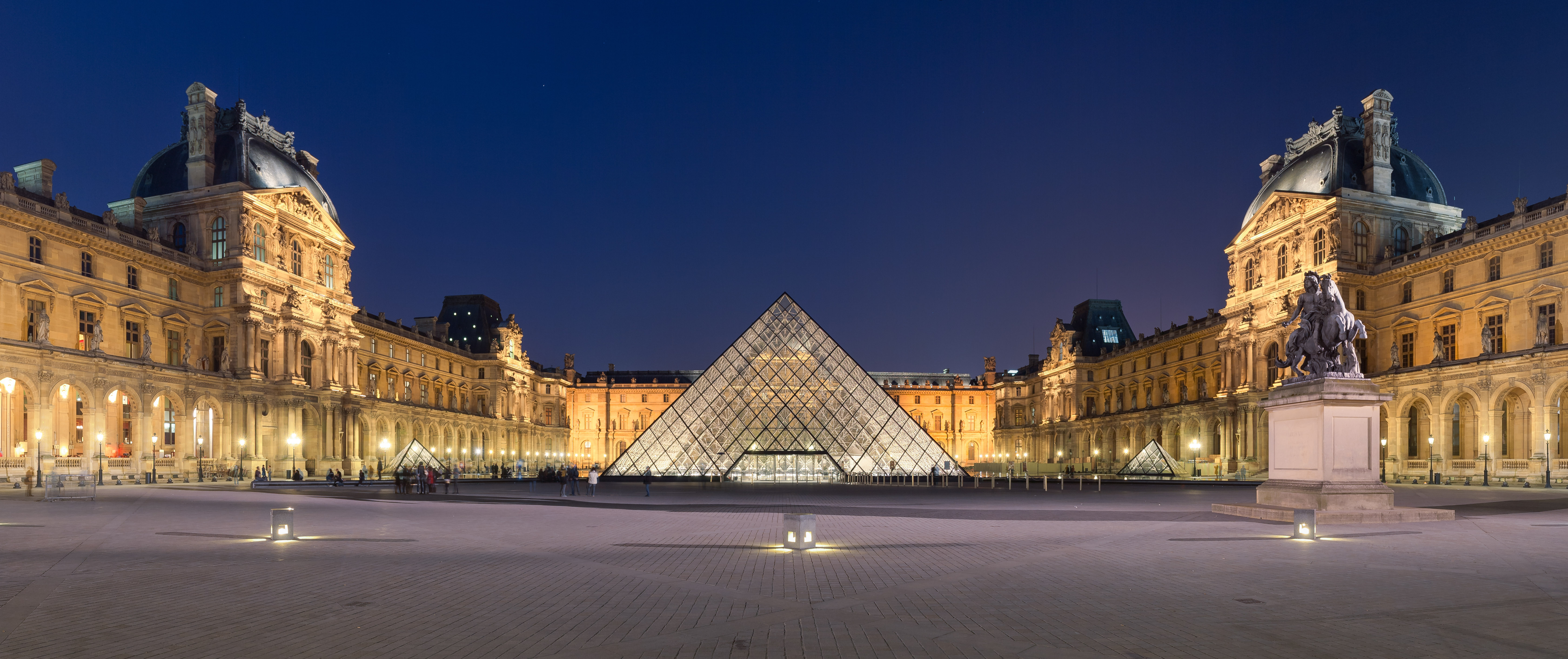
The Louvre Pyramid in Paris

=== Louvre Pyramid ===
Monumental in scope and public in purpose, the best-known of the Grands Projets is the I. M. Pei redesign and expansion plan of the Musée du Louvre, adding an entrance within the Louvre Pyramid, commissioned by Mitterrand in 1984. Mitterrand insisted on personally inspecting the materials that were used during the construction of the Louvre pyramid, from its glass panels to its steel girders, something which struck the architect as unusual at his degree of interest.

=== Arab World Institute ===
The Arab World Institute is located on Rue des Fossés Saint Bernard and constructed from 1981 to 1987 with a floor space of 181,850 square feet (16,894 m^{2}). Jean Nouvel, together with Architecture-Studio, won the 1981 design competition. The building acts as a buffer zone between the Jussieu Campus, in large rationalist blocks, and the Seine. The building houses a museum, library, auditorium, restaurant, and offices.

Above the glass-clad storefront, a metallic screen unfolds with moving geometric motifs. The motifs are actually 240 motor-controlled apertures, which open and close every hour. They act as brise soleil to control the light entering the building. The mechanism creates interior spaces with filtered light — an effect often used in Islamic architecture with its climate-oriented strategies. This building catapulted Nouvel to fame and is one of the cultural reference points of Paris, receiving the Aga Khan Award for Architecture.

Located on the left bank of the Seine River, in the heart of historic Paris, Arab World Institute, a bold expression of "architecture of glass and metal", where other buildings such as the Paris Mosque, other institutions, buildings and places that mark milestones in the exchanges between the Arab world and France, is described as "modern architectural symbol of dialogue between Western culture and the Arab world."

=== Opéra Bastille ===
The Opéra Bastille in Paris

In 1984, construction began on the Opéra Bastille at the Place de la Bastille, in the 12th arrondissement with the demolition of the Gare de la Bastille, which had closed in 1969. The building was designed by a Uruguayan-Canadian Carlos Ott who had won a competition. The building was inaugurated on 13 July 1989, on the 200th anniversary of the storming of the Bastille, with a gala concert conducted by Georges Prêtre and featuring singers such as Teresa Berganza and Plácido Domingo. The first opera performance was on 17 March 1990, with Berlioz' Les Troyens, directed by Pier Luigi Pizzi.

It is the largest opera house in Paris with 30 floors, 10 floors in the basement. Each floor has 22,000 square metres (240,000 sq ft) area. There are 45 kilometres (28 mi) of corridors in the building. It has backstage areas, workshops, and other essential infrastructure facilities. Its decors are fixed on carriers that run on tracks. These are moved to the stages in a few minutes (using elevators) which facilitates concurrent rotating performances to be held. The main hall has 2,700 seats. It cost 2.8 billion FF to build. The railway station and the bridge that existed here have become part of the Promenade plantée, an elevated park that extends over many kilometres to the city limits on the east.

=== Ministry of the Economy and Finance building ===
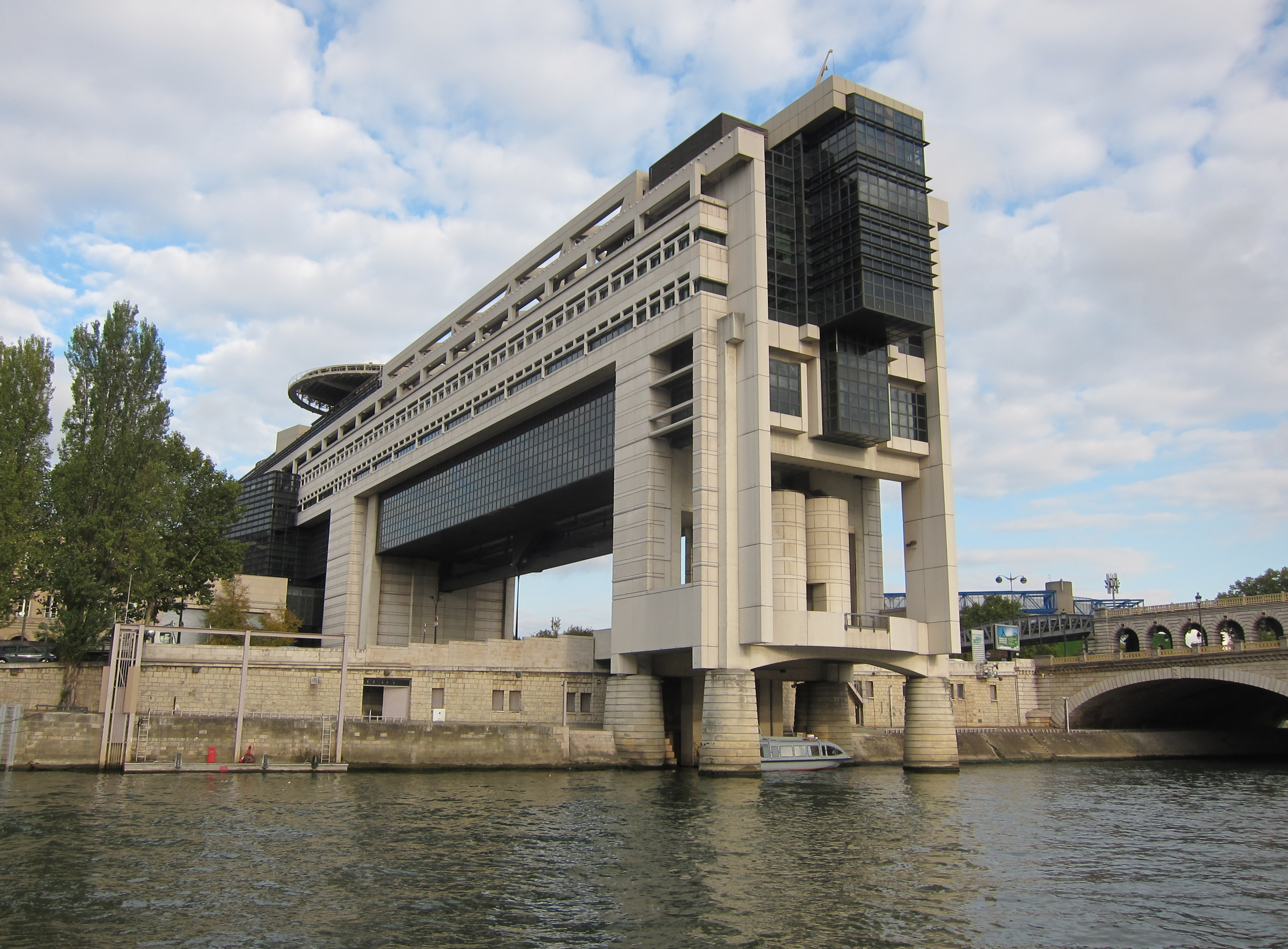
The Ministry of the Economy and Finance building on the Seine

The Ministry of the Economy and Finance building is located at 1 Boulevard de Bercy. It extends down to the Seine and was the result of a 1982 competition. A national competition was held with entrants providing building designs for 225,000 square metres (2,420,000 sq ft) of office space which would constitute a "grand gesture". Height restrictions of the time precluded the construction of a tower on the narrow site that was T-shaped and split in two by the Rue de Bercy Paul Chemetov and Borja Huidobro were the winning designers. The Ministry of Finance and Economy was located in the Richelieu Wing of the Louvre and had to be relocated with the repurpose of the Louvre.

Built in 1988, Building A and Building B bridge over the Rue de Bercy. At 70 metres (230 ft) in length, six levels each span over Quai de la Rapee. The building is nicknamed the "steamboat" because of its extreme length. A viaduct became a principal building facade with a moat separating the buildings from the boulevard. The Ministère des Finances building received mixed reviews, including a comparison to Fascist and Stalinist architecture, or a motorway tollgate.

=== Bibliothèque nationale de France ===
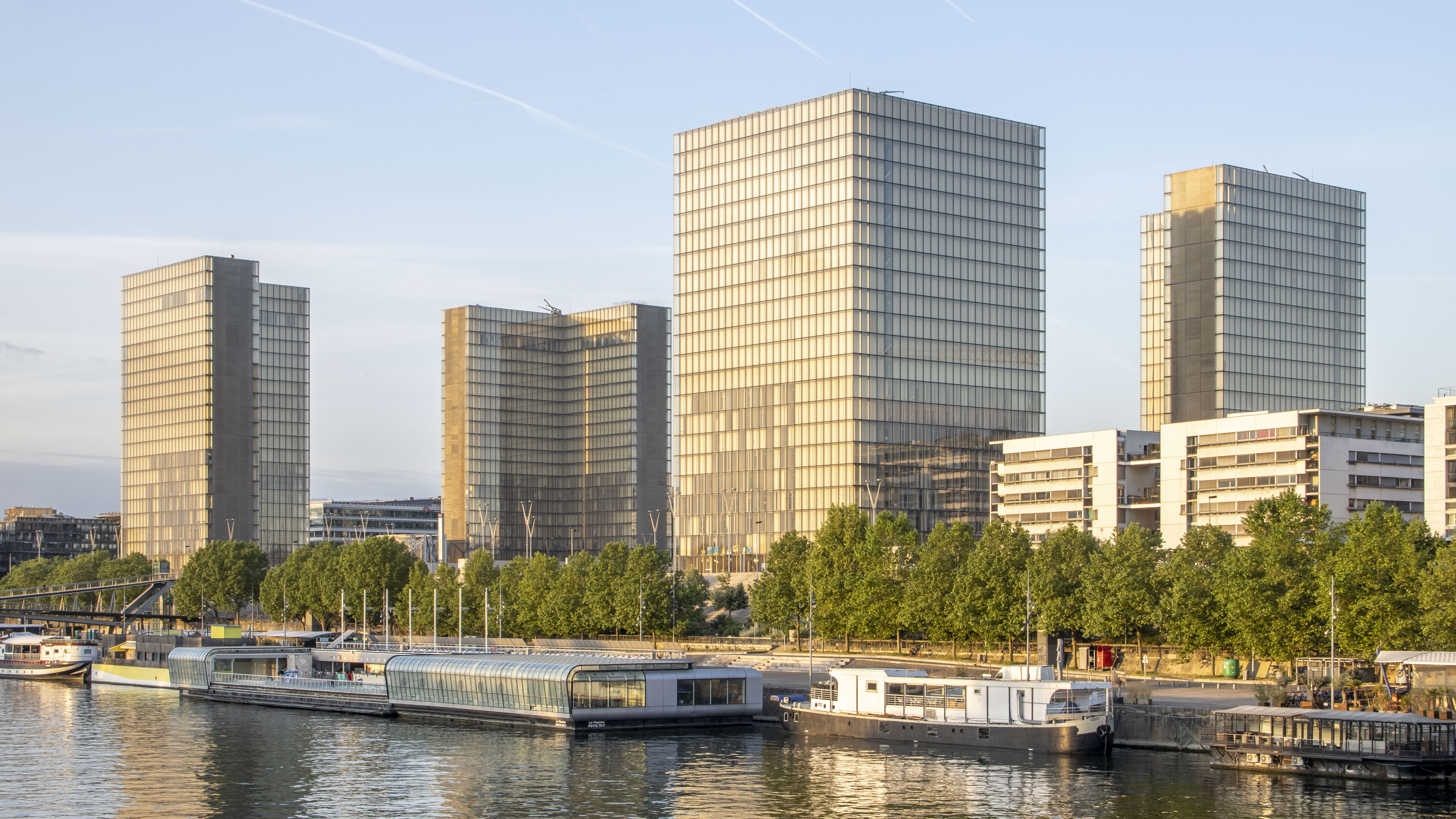
The Bibliothèque nationale de France in Paris

Opened in 1996, the Bibliothèque nationale de France was the last and most costly of the Grands Projets built in Paris. It consists of four 25-story L-shaped towers representing open books, "arranged at the corners of a giant platform around a sunken garden". After the move of the major collections from the Rue de Richelieu, the National Library of France was inaugurated on 15 December 1996 and today contains more than ten million volumes.

Construction of the library ran into huge cost overruns and technical difficulties related to its high-rise design, so much so that it was then referred to as the "TGB" or "Très Grande Bibliothèque" (i.e. "Very Large Library," a sarcastic allusion to France's successful high-speed rail system, the TGV).

=== Tjibaou Cultural Centre ===
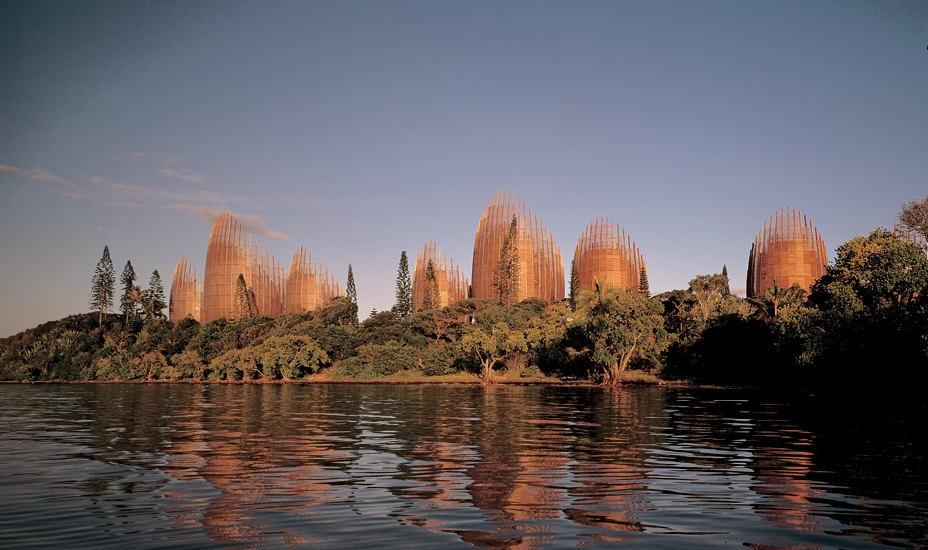
The Jean-Marie Tjibaou Cultural Centre in New Caledonia

The Jean-Marie Tjibaou Cultural Centre, in Nouméa, New Caledonia, Melanesia is the only one of the Grands Projets built outside of Metropolitan France. It was built on the site of the Festival Melanesia 2000, which had occurred 25 years earlier. It was designed by the Italian architect, Renzo Piano.

=== Centre International de Conferences ===
The Centre International de Conferences was the last of the Grands Projets. Designed by Francis Soler, 1990 winner of the Grand Prix national de l'architecture, the centre was not built due to cost overruns of the Bibliothèque nationale. The Musée du quai Branly commissioned by president Jacques Chirac was built instead on the site.

== Reaction and criticism ==
While an initial negative reaction to the Grands Projets viewed it as a continuation of the traditional east/west shift in Paris power, a shift in viewpoint occurred after some time. This resulted after many of the projects were constructed on the working-class eastern side of Paris, and the projects brought a re-emphasis to the Seine.

Considered expensive and controversial, Frommer's said "The majority were considered controversial or even offensive when completed". Mitterrand's projects have been criticised as being empire-building, as well as compromising the "fabric" of Paris. Public taxes had to be raised to finance the project, amounting to a massive €4.6 billion derived from taxes. The library was strongly criticised by the French press and has suffered since from "operational problems" and maintenance issues.
