= Sabine Barles =

French civil engineer and urban planner

Sabine Barles (born 1965)is a French civil engineer and scholar of urban planning, whose research focuses on urban metabolism, the movement of materials into, through, and out of cities. She holds the title of professeure des universités at Paris 1 Panthéon-Sorbonne University.

== Education and career ==
Barles received a diploma in civil engineering from the Institut national des sciences appliquées de Lyon in 1988, a diplôme d'études approfondies (the equivalent of a master's degree) in urban planning jointly through the École nationale des ponts et chaussées and Paris 8 University in 1989, a second diplôme d'études approfondies in the history of technology from the School for Advanced Studies in the Social Sciences and the Conservatoire national des arts et métiers in 1990, and a doctorate in urban studies in 1993 through the École nationale des ponts et chaussées. She received a habilitation through Paris 1 University in 2004.

She was maître de conférences at the French Institute of Urbanism from 1993 to 2006, and then professor there until 2011. From 2008 to 2013 she was also a junior member of the Institut Universitaire de France. She became a professor at Paris 1 University in 2011.

== Recognition ==
Barles received the CNRS Silver Medal in 2023. She was the 2025 recipient of the Grand Prix de l'urbanisme of the French Ministry for Ecology, Energy, Sustainable Development and Planning.

The University of Liège gave Barles an honorary doctorate in 2020.
