= Grand Prix de l'urbanisme =

French urban planning award

The Grand prix de l'urbanisme is awarded for urban planning in France by the Ministry for Ecology, Energy, Sustainable Development and Planning. The prize has been awarded annually since 1989, except during the period from 1994 until 1998, when it was not awarded.

A book is published each year, detailing the work of the award winner and other nominees.

== Prize winners ==
Year	Laureate
2025	Sabine Barles
2024	Claire Schorter
2023	Simon Teyssou
2022	Franck Boutté
2021	L'AUC
2020	Jacqueline Osty
2019	Patrick Bouchain
2018	Agence Ter
2017	Pierre Veltz
2016	Ariella Masboungi
2015	Gérard Penot
2014	Frédéric Bonnet
2013	Paola Viganò
2012	François Grether
2011	Michel Desvigne
2010	Laurent Théry
2009	François Ascher
2008	David Mangin
2007	Yves Lion
2006	Francis Cuillier
2005	Bernard Reichen
2004	Christian de Portzamparc
2003	Michel Corajoud
2002	Bruno Fortier
2001	Jean-Louis Subileau
2000	Alexandre Chemetoff
1999	Philippe Panerai and Nathan Starkman
1998	Christian Devillers
1993	Bernard Huet
1992	Antoine Grumbach
1991	Jean Dellus
1990	Jean-François Revert
1989	Michel Steinebach
