= Opéra Bastille =

French opera house

- The Opéra Bastille in 2022
- Interactive map of Opéra Bastille
- Address: Place de la Bastille; 75012 Paris; France
- Coordinates: 48°51′7″N 2°22′14″E
- Capacity: 2,745
- Type: Opera house
- Public transit: Bastille, Lyon, 20, 29, 65, 69, 76, 86, 87, 91

Construction
- Built: 1984–1990
- Opened: 1989
- Architect: Carlos Ott

Tenant
- Paris Opera

Website
- operadeparis.fr

The Opéra Bastille (French: [ɔpeʁa bastij], "Bastille Opera House") is a modern opera house in the 12th arrondissement of Paris, France. Inaugurated in 1989 as part of President François Mitterrand's Grands Travaux, it became the main facility of the Paris National Opera, France's principal opera company, alongside the older Palais Garnier; most opera performances are shown at the Bastille along with some ballet performances and symphony concerts, while Palais Garnier presents a mix of opera and ballet performances.

Designed by Uruguayan-Canadian architect Carlos Ott, it is situated facing Place de la Bastille. It can seat 2,723 people in total, with a main theatre, concert hall and studio theatre, making it the largest opera house in Europe.

== History ==
=== Background and construction ===
The idea of a new "popular and modern" opera house in Paris first arose in the 1880s, only years after the opening of the Palais Garnier. It would remain virtual for a century and reemerge periodically due to the recurrent "crisis at the Opera" and to the limitations imposed on modern opera production by the palais Garnier. It was notably promoted in 1965–1968 by stage director Jean Vilar, the most prominent figure in "popular theatre" at the time, who had been commissioned a reform project for the National Opera Theatre and echoed composer Pierre Boulez’ provocative appeal to "blow up opera houses", as well as by senior civil servant François Bloch-Lainé in a 1977 report on the Opera's management and perspectives.

In 1981, the newly elected President François Mitterrand included a new opera house in his large monument-building programme known as the "Grands Travaux". The project was originally part of the Cité de la musique, a complex of musical institutions in North-Eastern Paris. It was quickly decided to separate it and to build it in the Bastille area of Paris, a relatively working-class district that also evoked the French Revolution and was a traditional starting or ending point for demonstrations. The following year, an international competition was launched, under supervision of the Opéra Bastille Public Corporation (EPOB), to select an architect. 756 entries were received, and, in November 1983, the competition was won by little-known architect Carlos Ott, an Uruguayan living in Canada. It was said that the jury, who—as it is common with architectural competitions—did not know the names or track-records of the entrants, mistakenly assumed the design was by the distinguished American architect Richard Meier.

Opéra Bastille shortly after inauguration in 1989

Construction began in 1984 with the demolition of the gare de la Bastille train station, which had opened in 1859 and closed in 1969, and where art expositions had been held thereafter. In 1986, the new right-wing government led by Jacques Chirac considered canceling the project, but eventually decided it was too advanced and gave it the green light again. President Mitterrand remained personally involved throughout the building process, to the point that the planning team referred to him to decide on the seats’ colour following internal disagreement. (He chose black.)

In the original project, the house also included a small concert hall and a multi-purpose hall ("salle modulable"). The latter was a public request by Pierre Boulez, who had long been publicly lamenting the lack of a proper venue for contemporary music and experimental performances in Paris. However, due to the construction delays, it was eventually shelved, much to Boulez’ irritation, and a similar facility was eventually built as part of the Cité de la musique. The concert hall, known as the Bastille Amphitheatre (amphithéâtre Bastille), was maintained and built.

After massive budget overruns, the final construction cost was at 2.8 billion French francs.

The building was inaugurated by François Mitterrand on 13 July 1989, on the eve of the 200th anniversary of the storming of the Bastille, in the presence of thirty-three foreign heads of state or heads of government. A semi-staged gala concert, directed by Robert Wilson under the title la Nuit avant le jour (The Night Before the Day), was conducted by Georges Prêtre and featured singers such as Teresa Berganza and Plácido Domingo. The Paris Opera's traditional Bastille Day free concert was given there the following day.

The opera house was unfinished at the time of the official inauguration, and did not see its first opera performance until 17 March 1990, with Hector Berlioz’ les Troyens, directed by Pier Luigi Pizzi.

=== Troubles and controversies ===
West façade of the opéra Bastille, on the rue de Lyon.

The Opéra Bastille's management and reputation were marred by a number of controversies and scandals in the house's first decade, from before its opening.

In 1987, conductor Daniel Barenboim, who had previously led the orchestre de Paris, was hired to become the house's first Artistic Director, and began planning the first seasons. In January 1989, six months before inauguration, the company's board chairman Pierre Bergé, otherwise head of the Yves Saint Laurent fashion house, fired Barenboim, reportedly after the conductor's refusal to cut his pay by half as well as due to his modernist stance, which Bergé deemed unfit for a "popular" opera house. It was also noted that Barenboim had been hired by a right-wing government, while Bergé was a prominent supporter and donor of the Socialist Party. This decision proved extremely controversial in the artistic field: Patrice Chéreau backed off the staging of the inaugural gala, composer Pierre Boulez resigned from the Board of Directors, and Herbert von Karajan and Georg Solti, along with several other prominent conductors, signed a letter of protest and called for a boycott of the opéra Bastille, canceling their own concerts there. This made the search for a new artistic director difficult; in May, Bergé was finally able to announce the appointment of Korean pianist and conductor Myung-whun Chung, then young and practically unknown in France. Chung took the pit for the first opera performance in May 1990.

Although his term was later extended to last until 2000, Chung was fired in 1994 after the right-wing coalition's election victory, the end of Pierre Bergé's board tenure and a power play with the company's Director designate, Hugues Gall, who cancelled his contract; at the height of the conflict, Chung was physically prevented from entering the building despite a judicial ruling in his favour.

The building was as much a source of trouble as the leadership conflicts. As early as 1991, a few of the 36,000 Burgundy limestone panels covering the facade began to fall, which led to the installation of safety nets over some external walls in 1996; they were dubbed "condoms with holes" by the disgruntled Director. Several major alterations had to be carried out in the following years, including that of the soundproofing structure and adjusting the orchestra pit's acoustics; each change proved complex and sometimes involved court proceedings to determine who was responsible. The facade problems were not solved until 2009 with the installation of new tiles made of composite material and attached differently. However, as of 2022 many nets were still in place on the facades.

=== Operations ===
The Opéra Bastille was originally expected to become the company's sole opera venue, with the Palais Garnier turned into a dedicated ballet venue. However, this strict division was abandoned in the 1990s when some operas were performed at the Palais Garnier and the company's ballet also danced at the Bastille. Since then, most opera performances take place at the modern house with some ballet performances and a few symphony concerts every season, while the traditional house presents a mix of opera and ballet performances.

Hugues Gall, who took over as the Paris National Opera's Director in 1995, was originally an opponent of the Bastille project, famously quipping that the new opera house was "the wrong answer to a problem that did not exist". In his nine-year term, he is however credited with stabilising the company's administrative, artistic and financial situation, partly due to the possibilities offered by the modern theatre: higher revenues due to the larger seating capacity, wider range of technical means for stage directors, better working environment, higher scheduling flexibility.

== Design ==
Detail view of the Place de la Bastille facade and external staircase. Patrons do not use the stairs, but enter through the street-level doors to the right.

Auditorium

The Opéra Bastille is located on the place de la Bastille. In order to make it "blend into" the landscape, the square was not remodelled to be aligned with it in a general parallel plan, but the left-hand side of the facade was left partly hidden behind an older and smaller building, which was expected to give the impression that the opera house had been part of the area for a very long time. The building then elongates itself behind the facade following a generally triangular shape, hidden by other buildings around. The theatre is "surmounted by the opaque cube of the stage building and wrapped in gridded walls of glass… the Opera stands sociably open to the world outside, whereas the foyers, with their broad overview of the city, have the slick, impersonal look of an airport lounge." These foyers run around the theatre's auditorium on several levels and give the external glass facade its round shape.

Access to the entrance hall is directly from the square at street level. Although a monumental external staircase leading to the first-level foyer and a direct underground access from the Bastille metro station to the entrance hall were built, they were eventually closed.

The theatre's auditorium was designed with 2,723 seats, later reduced to 2,703. It is organised in an arena format with two huge balconies at the back, with a few narrow balconies on the sides. It was a conscious, egalitarian, departure from the Palais Garnier, which has several dozen types of seats and does not offer stage visibility from all of them. Every seat at the Opéra Bastille offers an unrestricted view of the stage, it is the very same type of seat with the same level of comfort, and there are no boxes. Subtitles are visible from every seat except for those at the very back of the arena and of the first balcony. In 2005, two small standing room areas were created at the back of the arena; tickets are sold for €5, only on the evening of the performance. There is no "royal" or "presidential box"; instead, one of the regular seats in the arena, on the "VIP" row (row 15) just after the central aisle, is considered the presidential seat, although not all Presidents since 1989 have been avid opera-goers.

Due to its size, the auditorium is frequently—and unfavourably—called a "vessel", and, compared to other world-class opera houses, the acoustics have been described as at best disappointing. One technical feature destined to make it better is that the floor of the orchestra pit is actually a small elevator, which makes it possible to adapt the pit to the requirements of the performance, elevating it for a smaller orchestra and lowering it for a larger and louder one; in its largest configuration, the pit has room for 130 players.

House right side of the first balcony, as seen from the back of the arena.

The hall is generally cold in colour due to the prominence of grey granite, black or white stone and black fabric in the structure and decoration as well as to the lightning from the giant white glass ceiling, although the use of pearwood for the seats and handrails and of oak for the floor brings a warmer, light brown touch. This modern design has been controversial ever since the house's opening, with part of the audience preferring the elaborately ornate and gilded decoration of the traditional Palais Garnier.

The backstage occupies an enormous area (5,000 m^{2}), six times larger than the stage: the stage area is flanked left and right with areas of the same size, and these three areas are replicated towards the back of the theatre. A system of rails and a rotating dock make it possible to roll entire sets on and off on giant motorised platforms in a few minutes and to store these platforms on the available backstage spots; quick changes of set enable the artists to rehearse a work in the afternoon and to perform another one in the evening within the same space, something impossible at the Palais Garnier. The use of such platforms also makes it considerably easier to use three-dimensional sets rather than traditional flat images. Under the stage is a giant elevator, which is used to lower unused set platforms to an underground storehouse as large as the backstage itself.

The building also includes a rehearsal room that is identical in size and shape to the theatre's pit and stage areas.
