= Bercy =

Neighbourhood in Paris

Coordinates: 48°50′10″N 2°23′0″E

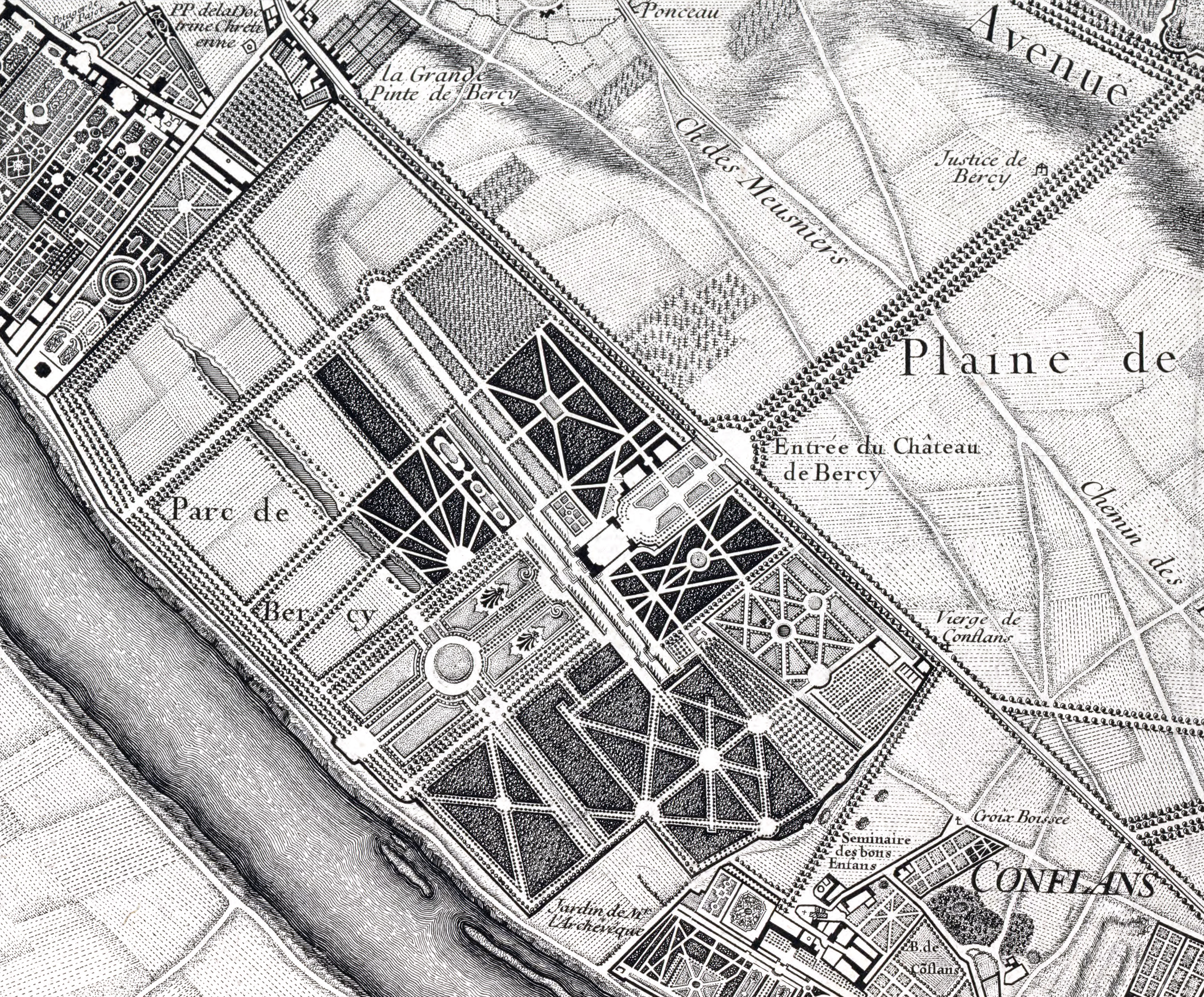
Bercy on a 1731 map of Paris and its environs.

Bercy (French pronunciation: [bɛʁsi]) is a neighbourhood in the 12th arrondissement of Paris, France, the city's 47th administrative neighbourhood.

== History ==
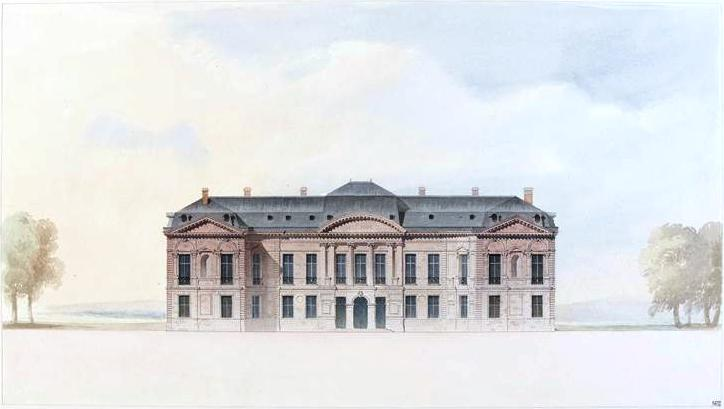
Drawing of the Château de Bercy.

Some of the oldest vestiges of human occupation in Paris were found on the territory of Bercy, dating from the late Neolithic (between 4000 and 3800 BC).

The name of Bercy, or Bercix, appeared for the first time in property deeds in the twelfth century. The area belonged for a time to the Montmorency family before passing to the Malons family, who had an old manor house expanded by François Le Vau into the Château de Bercy.

In the eighteenth century, a large site located along the Seine, contiguous to the Paris city limits of the time, began to be used as a warehousing area, particularly for wine. For two hundred years, the area was the thriving centre of the Paris wine trade and a place with a unique life and culture.

Bercy was formerly a commune. In 1860, when Paris annexed its suburban zone, the commune of Bercy was dissolved. The north-west portion of its territory was consolidated into Paris while the south-east portion, beyond the fortifications, was consolidated into Charenton-le-Pont.

== Features ==
Map

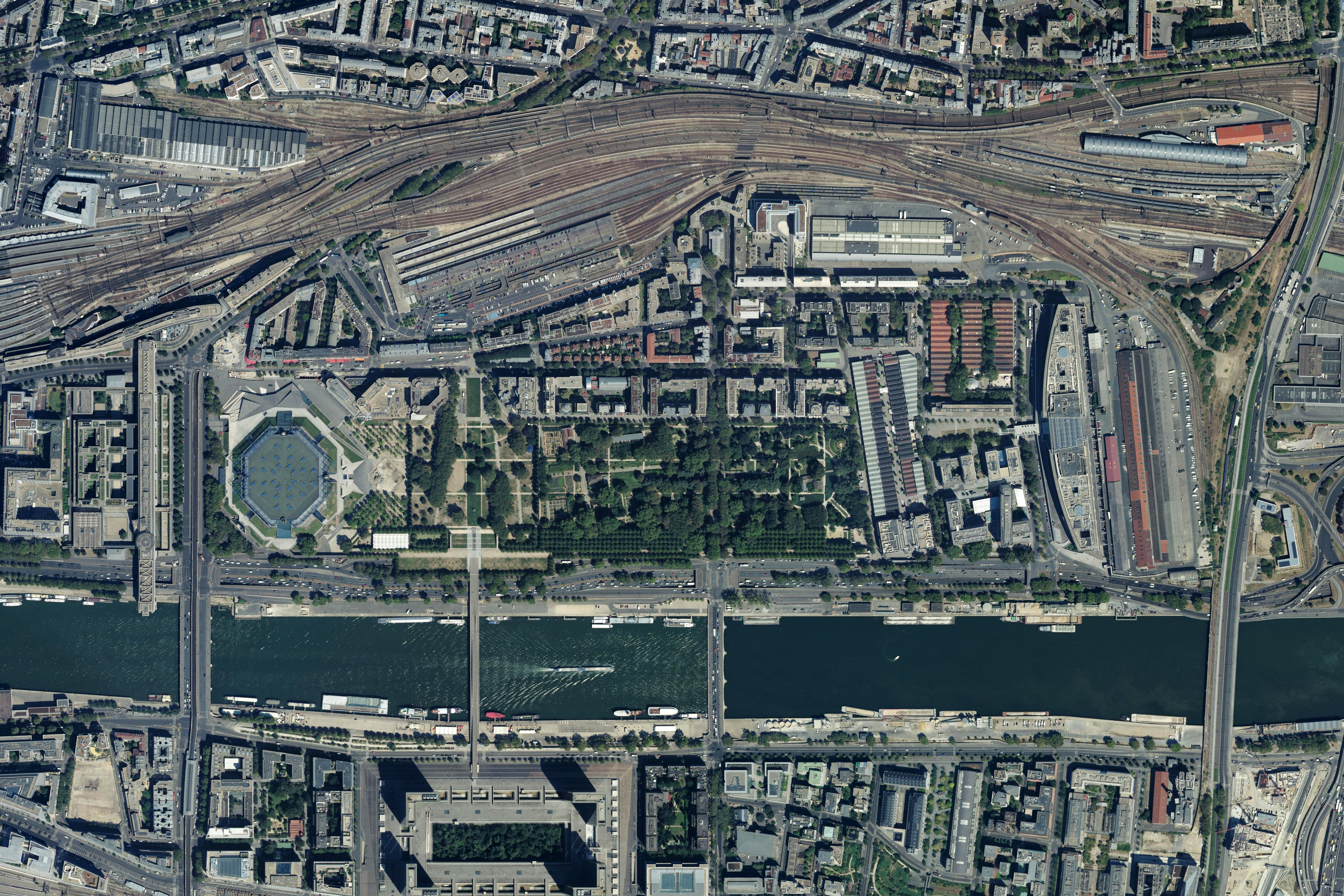
Aerial view

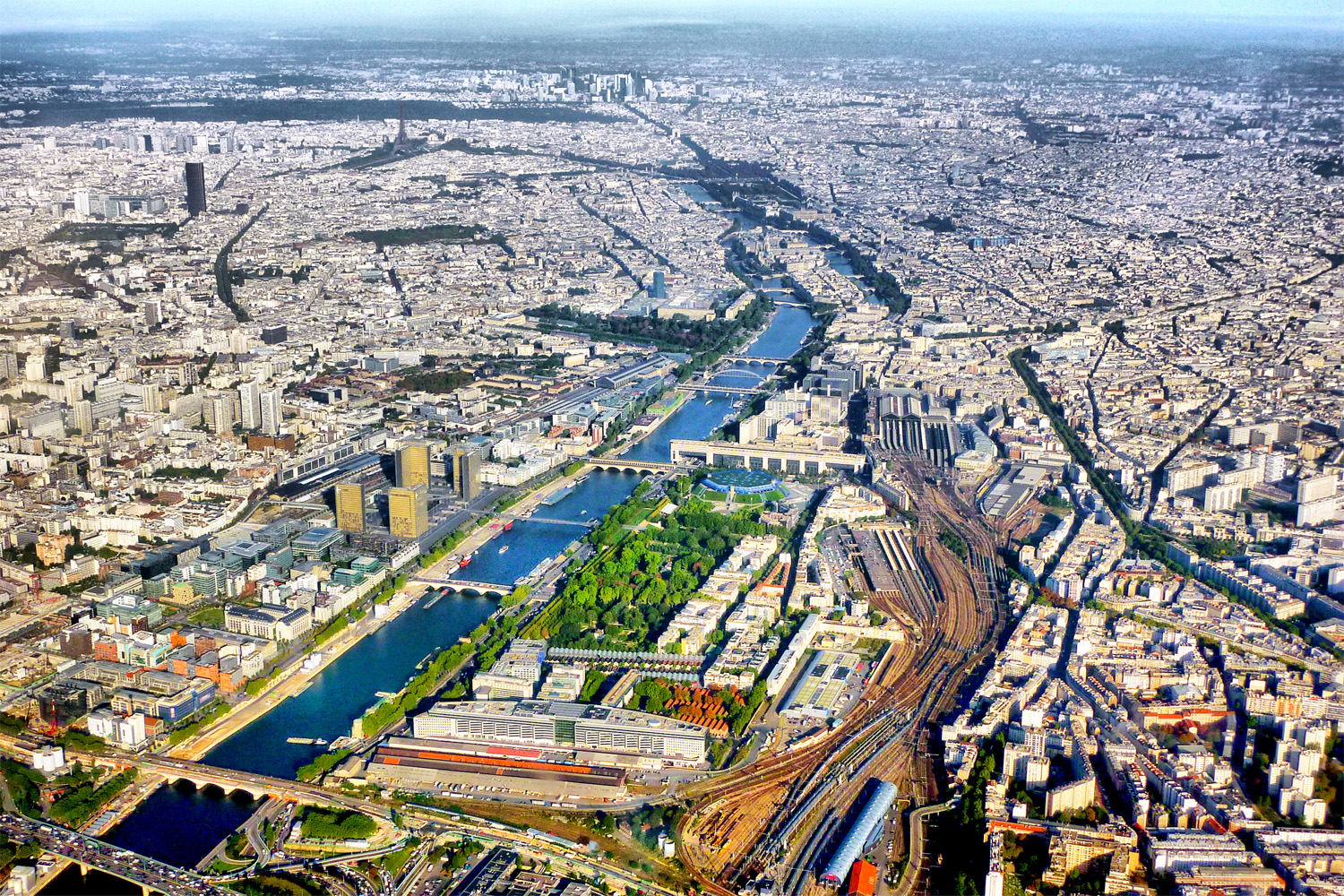
Aerial view of the neighborhood

The area features a number of well-known landmarks:

- The Ministry of the Economy and Finance building (often known simply as "Bercy"), built in the 1980s; the extremity of the building plunges into the river Seine, where two fast boats dedicated to VIP transportation are moored.
- The Palais Omnisports de Paris-Bercy (POPB) is a large sports hall often used for concerts. It is now called AccorHotels Arena
- The Parc de Bercy
- The Cinémathèque Française, formerly the American Center, designed by Frank Gehry
- The Cour Saint-Émilion shopping complex
- The UGC Ciné Cité Bercy movie complex
- The Musée des Arts Forains ("The Fairground Art Museum").

Paris Metro Line 14 crosses the neighbourhood. There are two stations: Bercy and Cour Saint-Émilion.
