= Joanne Roney =

Local government officer in Birmingham, England

Joanne Roney CBE

Managing Director Birmingham City Council
- Incumbent
- Assumed office September 2024
- Preceded by: Graeme Betts

Chief Executive Manchester City Council
- In office 1 April 2017 – September 2024
- Preceded by: Howard Bernstein
- Succeeded by: Eamonn Boylan

Chief Executive Wakefield Metropolitan District Council
- In office July 2008 – March 2017

Personal details
- Born: 13 September 1961 (age 65) Shard End, Birmingham, England
- Relatives: 3 brothers, 2 sisters
- Education: Birmingham University

Joanne Lucille Roney CBE (born 13 September 1961) has been Managing Director of Birmingham City Council since September 2024. Prior to this, she served as the Chief Executive of Manchester City Council.

== Early life ==
Roney was born in September 1961 and grew up on a council estate in Shard End, Birmingham.

== Career ==
Roney was an apprentice at 16 with Birmingham City Council's housing department. She later went on to become Director of Housing for Kirklees Metropolitan Borough Council, West Yorkshire. She then worked for 10 years as Sheffield City Council's Executive Director of housing and community care where she was involved in the regeneration of Park Hill estate by Urban Splash. While working her way through the ranks she studied part-time at Birmingham University and gained an MBA in public sector management.

Roney became Chief executive for Wakefield Metropolitan District Council in July 2008.

In 2009, the Anglo Irish Bank, which was funding half of the £200 million need for Trinity Walk shopping centre, Wakefield, collapsed and the developer, Modus, went into administration.

Roney devised a rescue package of new finance and in 2010, the scheme was sold to a consortium (Sovereign Land, AREA Property Partners, and Shepherd Construction). She helped the council to create its own housing company, Bridge Homes, in joint partnership with WDH construction in 2014. Roney also oversaw the construction and opening of the Hepworth Wakefield Gallery.

Roney took up her position as the chief executive of Manchester City Council in April 2017.

On 17 October 2025, "The Telegraph" reported that Roney was accused of calling a property agent "a massive Jewish b---end." On 22 October 2025 the case against Manchester council and Joanne Roney for alleged discrimination on racial grounds was dropped, with the property agent claimant discontinuing his claims and paying all legal costs.

== Personal life ==
Roney has three brothers and two sisters. Her parents are deceased. She is a fan of Birmingham City F.C. and Star Wars. She also owns a rescue cat, Tiger.

== Honours ==
Roney was appointed Officer of the Order of the British Empire (OBE) in the 2009 New Year Honours and Commander of the Order of the British Empire (CBE) in the 2024 New Year Honours, both for services to local government.
