= William Hare Group =

UK based structural steel contractor

Coordinates: 53.61373°N 2.31712°W

William Hare Group Ltd
- Company type: Private company
- Industry: Construction
- Founded: 1888; 138 years ago in Bolton
- Founders: William Hare
- Headquarters: Brandlesholme, Bury
- Key people: Susan Hodgkiss (CEO, Chair); Hugo Camacho (COO)
- Products: Structural steel; Steel erection; Edge barriers; Cold formed steel; Hybrid structures
- Revenue: ▲£315.5 million (2023)
- Net income: ▲£4.3 million (2023)
- Number of employees: ▲1,947 (2023)
- Website: www.hare.com

William Hare Group Ltd is a UK headquartered structural steel contractor and the second largest, by turnover, in the country. It is family owned and has carried out projects in over fifty countries. Landmark works include structural steelwork for 20 Fenchurch Street and 201 Bishopsgate in London, and the Aldar Headquarters and Al Bahr Towers in Abu Dhabi.

William Hare Group manufactures in the UK and United Arab Emirates.

Aldar Headquarters

== History ==
William Hare started his eponymous enterprise in 1888. It incorporated as William Hare Ltd in 1945, and reorganised as William Hare Group Ltd in 1998.

The firm began as a Bolton based steel erector and in 1945 diversified into steel fabrication. During the 1960s and 1970s William Hare Ltd commenced producing fabricated steel for overseas petrochemical projects, in 1977 receiving a Queen's Award for Export.

The present Bury fabrication premises was acquired in 1977 with the purchase of California Engineering Company Ltd. In 1992 the business opened an office in Singapore, followed in 2002 by an engineering support office in Chennai.

Grandson of the founder, and Group Chief Executive David Hodgkiss, OBE died in 2020. He was succeeded as Group Chief Executive by his sister Susan Hodgkiss.

=== Acquisitions and new businesses ===
1977	California Engineering Company Ltd including Bury works.
1997	Assets of Hawkins Structures Ltd of Scarborough including Dunslow Road facility, from Cecil Hawkins' Canerector Inc.
1997	Westbury Tubular Structures Ltd including premises at Thorp Arch.
2005	Stake in Fabsec Ltd from Atlas Ward. (Note: Manufacturing lines were opened at the former Westbury Tubular Structures facility at Thorp Arch, and in the United Arab Emirates, to utilise Fabsec Ltd's cellular beam design software. At 31 December 2021, Fabsec Ltd's deficit attributable to shareholders was £959,245. Following the 2024 withdrawal of founding shareholder Tata Steel Ltd, 1/3 owned by Wlliam Hare Group. Remainder held by Sherwin-Williams UK Ltd and Severfield. As of 2024, Fabsec Ltd operates from William Hare's Thorp Arch manufacturing facility)
2005	Controlling interest in Headline Abu Dhabi, later rebranded William Hare UAE LLC.
2010	Assets of Site Coat Services Ltd, and leasehold premises in Grantham. (Note: Becoming William Hare Painting Ltd.)
2013	The intellectual property of Richard Lees Steel Decking Ltd, from Skanska Construction UK Ltd. (Note: Re-established as William Hare Decking Ltd, later renamed Richard Lees Decking Ltd. Formerly nationalised within the British Steel Corporation; purchased by Trafalgar House and later, Kvaerner. Richard Lees' stock yard business was sold separately to Structural Metal Decks.)
2014	Wigan leasehold premises, and plant of Eiffel Steelworks Ltd. (Note: Former subsidiary of Eiffage Métal / Eiffage. As of 2025, not listed as a William Hare facility.)
2019	Risca, Newport premises and equipment from Braithwaite Engineering Ltd, a subsidiary of Rowecord Holdings Ltd
2021	Rotherham fabrication facility from Hambleton Steel. (Note: Formerly Allott Bros. & Leigh, then Europa Engineering)

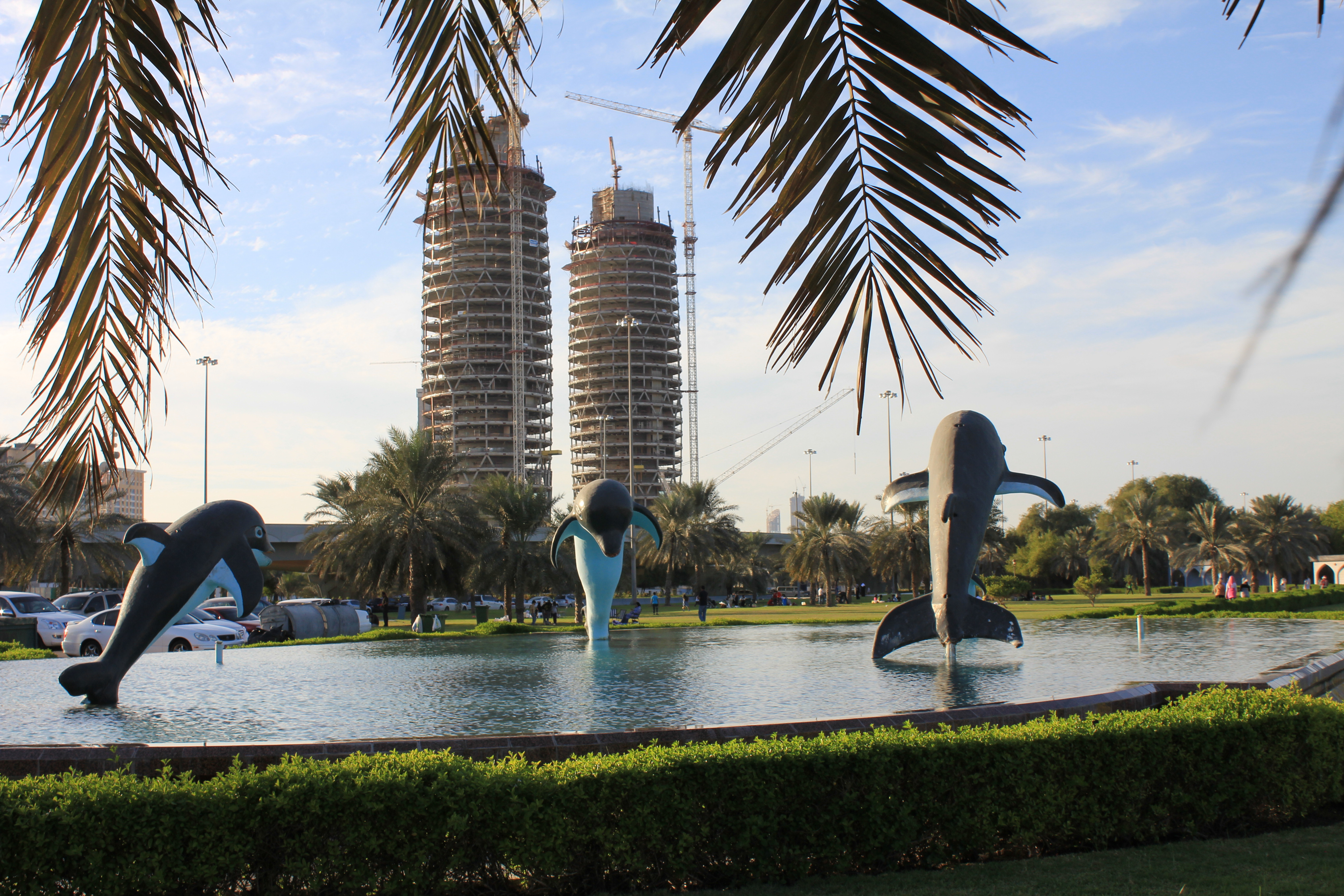
Al Bahr Towers under construction

== Locations ==
William Hare Group has steel fabrication facilities at Bury, Scarborough, Newport, Rotherham, Thorp Arch and in the United Arab Emirates. Coatings are applied at a Grantham site. The Derby plant manufactures cold-formed steel components and engineered timber / hybrid structures.

The Group operates sales and engineering support offices in London, Chennai, Singapore, Seoul and Porto.

A majority of the firm's staff are employed at overseas subsidiaries and branches.

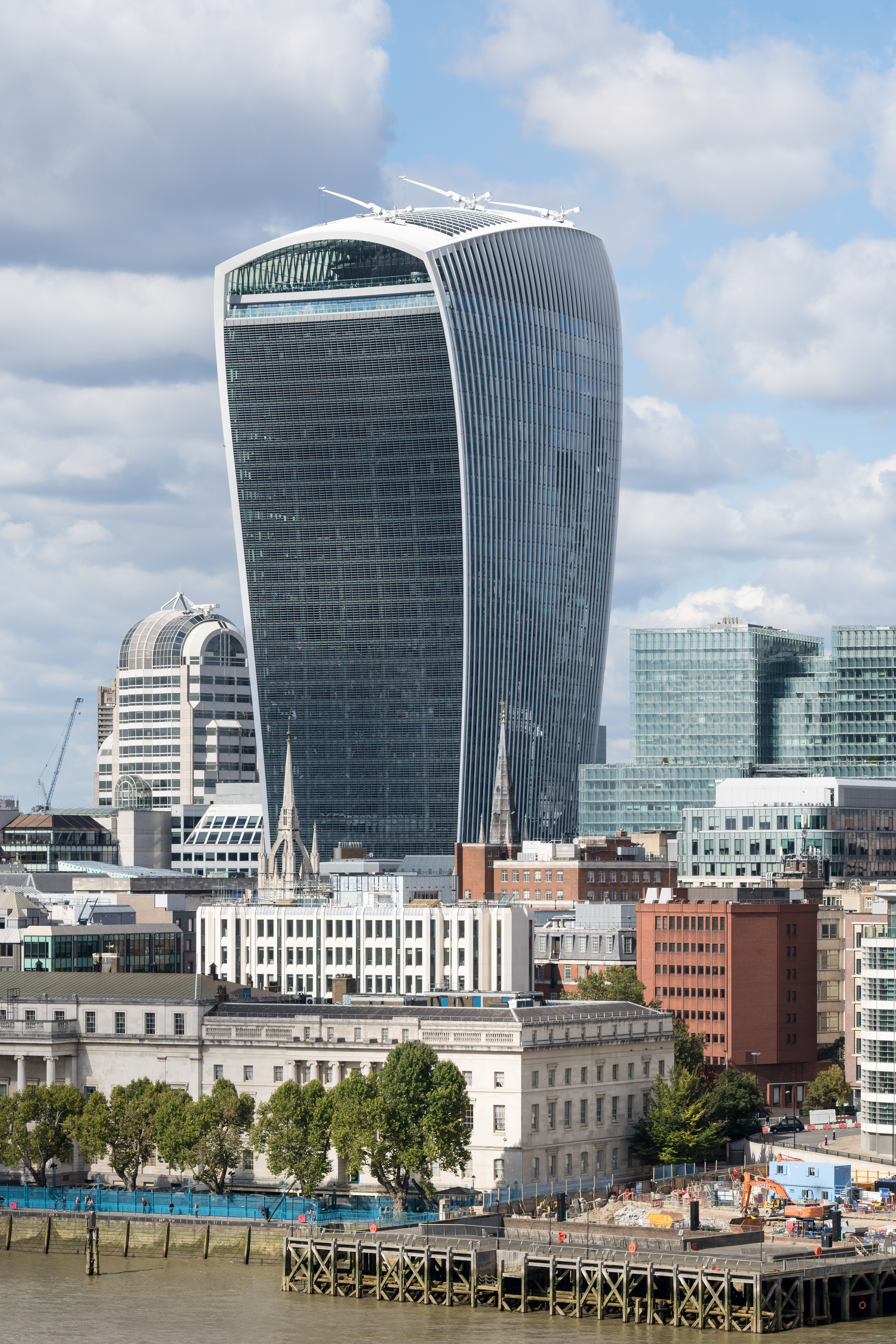
20 Fenchurch Street, London (2015)

== Controversies ==
=== Unfair dismissal ===
In a 2010 judgement, William Hare was found to have unfairly dismissed an employee. Judge Brain, however, reduced the financial award by 1/3 to take account of the employee's conduct before dismissal.

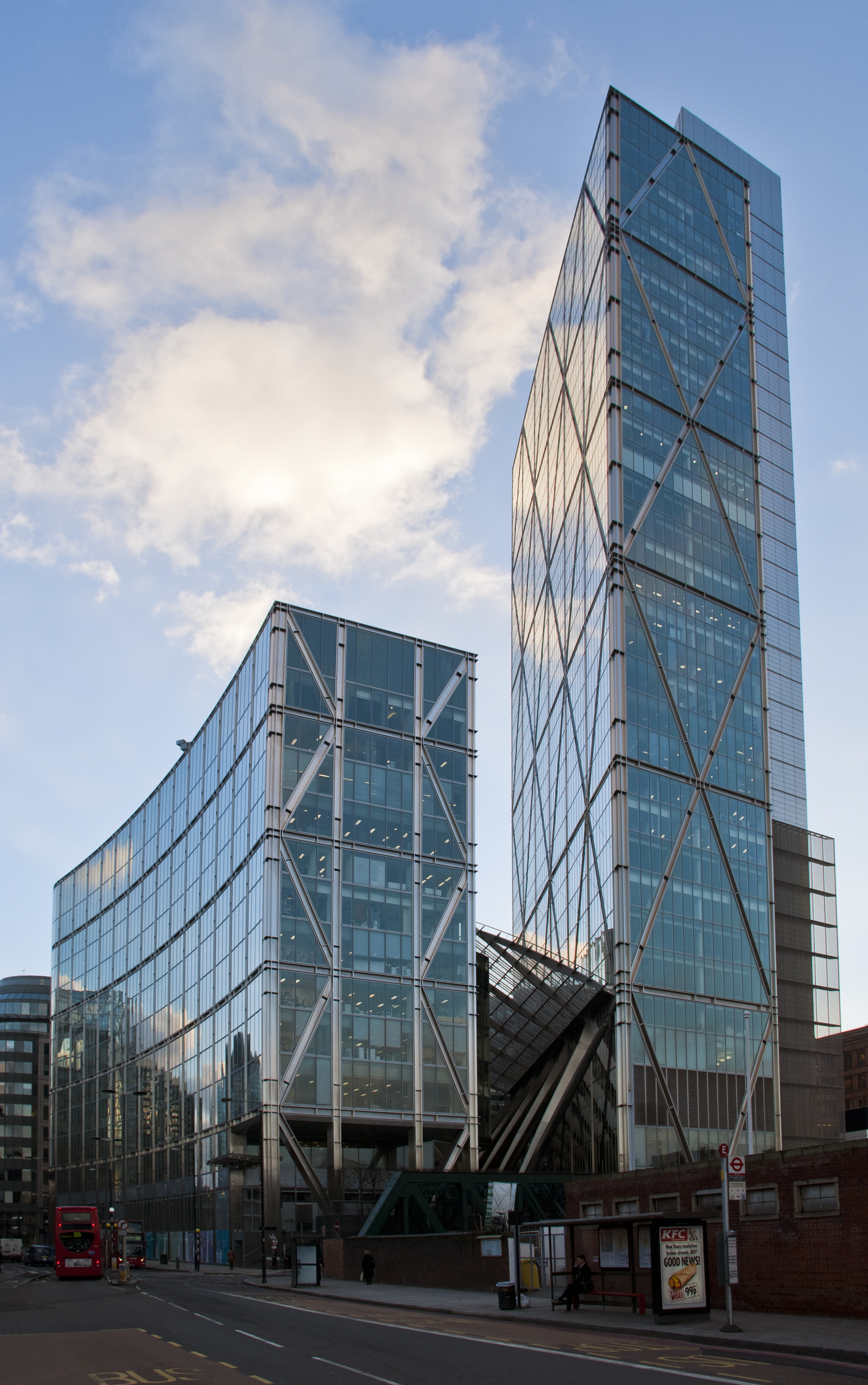
201 Bishopsgate

=== Trinity Walk ===
In 2008, Shepherd Construction contracted with William Hare Group to provide structural steelwork for Brendan Flood's Trinity Walk shopping centre development in Wakefield. Shepherd Construction subsequently sought, under a pay when paid clause, to withhold payment in the sum of £996,683.35. The ultimate client had gone into Administration. In 2009, Mr Justice Coulson of the Technology and Construction Court ruled against the payment being withheld. That judgement was upheld at the Court of Appeal in 2010. Shepherd Construction had used an obsolete form of words defining insolvency in its contract with William Hare Group.

=== Fatal fall ===
The Health and Safety Executive fined William Hare Group £75,000 plus £9,000 costs in 2003. An employee fell and died during 1998 extension works to the Imperial War Museum in London. William Hare Group pleaded guilty to a breach of section 2(1) of the Health and Safety at Work etc. Act 1974. The firm was criticised for its vague method statement, and for leaving workers to decide basic safety precautions. The unharnessed victim fell 13m from a precarious platform.

== See also ==
- British Constructional Steelwork Association
- Cleveland Bridge & Engineering Company
- Severfield
- Rowecord Engineering
