= Newport City footbridge =

Bridge over the River Usk in South Wales

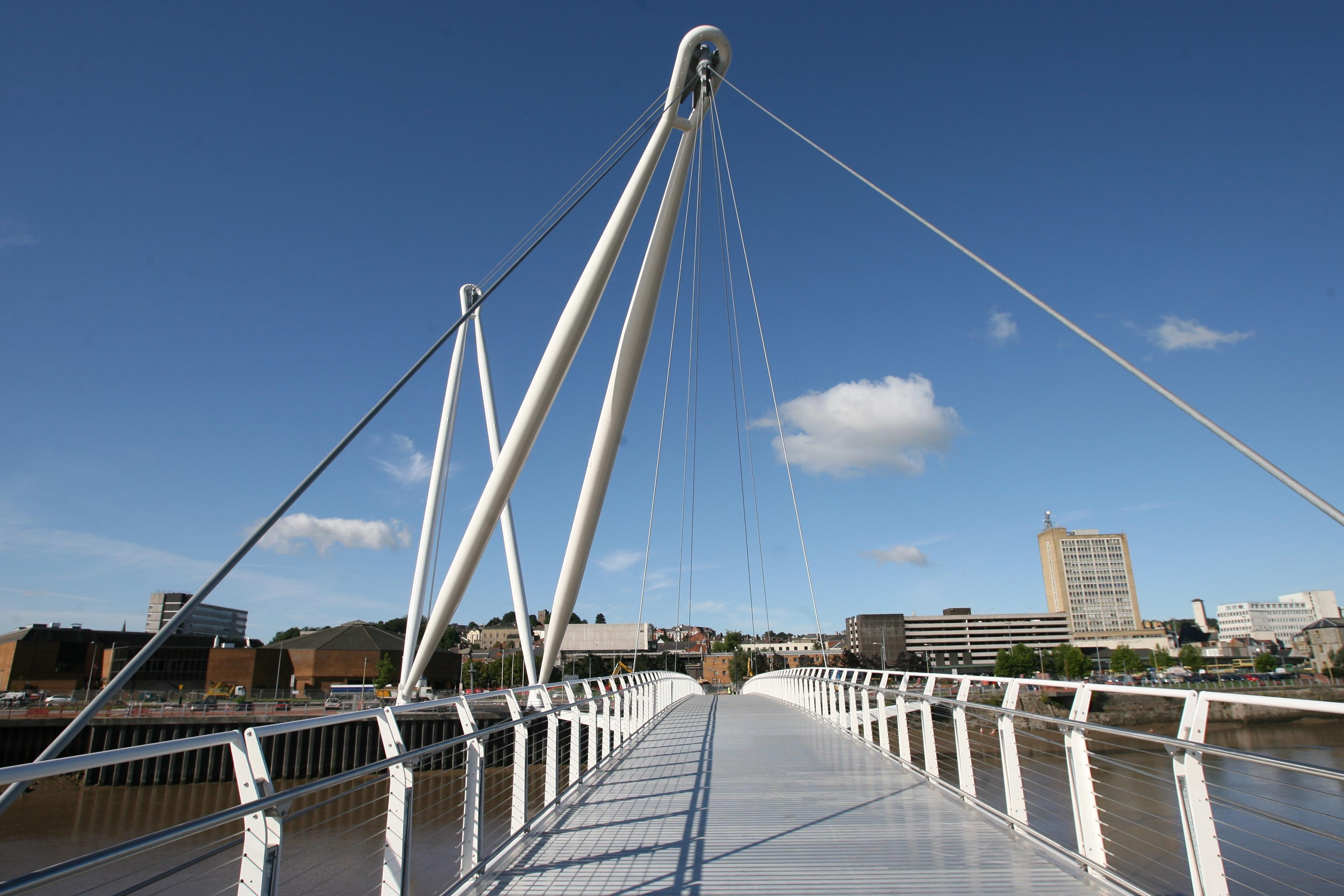
- Newport City footbridge from the east bank
- Coordinates: 51°35′13″N 2°59′25″W
- Carries: cyclists and pedestrians
- Crosses: River Usk
- Locale: Newport
- Official name: Newport City footbridge
- Maintained by: Newport City Council

Characteristics
- Design: Cable-stayed bridge
- Width: Deck 16 feet (4.9 m); Max. 49 feet (15 m)
- Clearance below: 13 1/2 feet (4.1 m) at high tide

History
- Opened: 12 September 2006

Newport City footbridge is a pedestrian/cycle bridge over the River Usk in the city of Newport, South Wales.

The bridge links the east bank of the river in the vicinity of Rodney Parade stadium to University Plaza on the west bank. It was the first major public project in Newport Unlimited's plans to regenerate the city.

It won a British Constructional Steelwork Association award; the 2007 George Gibby Award from the Institution of Civil Engineers in Wales; a Royal Institution of Chartered Surveyors award for regeneration in Wales, and a highly commended from Wales Business Insider for their best regeneration project of 2007.

== Overview ==
The bridge features two A-Frame masts, which support the bridge from the west bank. The masts are positioned on a shared foundation and anchored at ground level by two 4 3/4-inch (120 mm) diameter cables that are connected the tips of the masts. The forward mast is 262 feet (80 m) long and the back mast is 226 feet (69 m) long. Because of the angle at which the masts are positioned, the bridge stands at 229 ft (70 m) above ground. The deck is 16 ft (4.9 m) wide and 13 1/2 ft (4.1 m) above water at high tide. The bridge has a clear span of 476 feet (145 m).

- Contractors: Alfred McAlpine
- Architect: Grimshaw
- Structural Engineer: Atkins
- Steel Fabricators: Rowecord Engineering
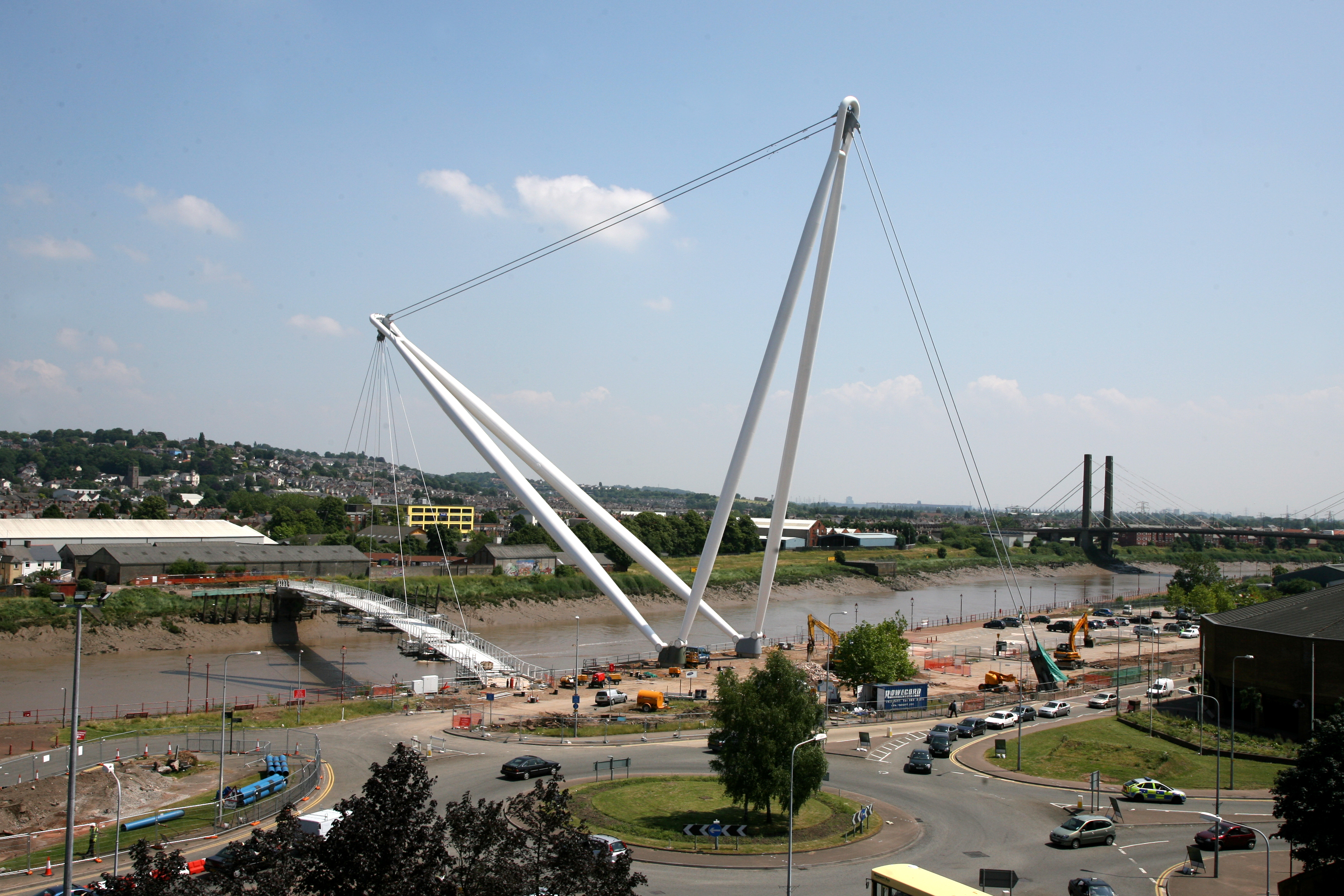
The bridge under construction

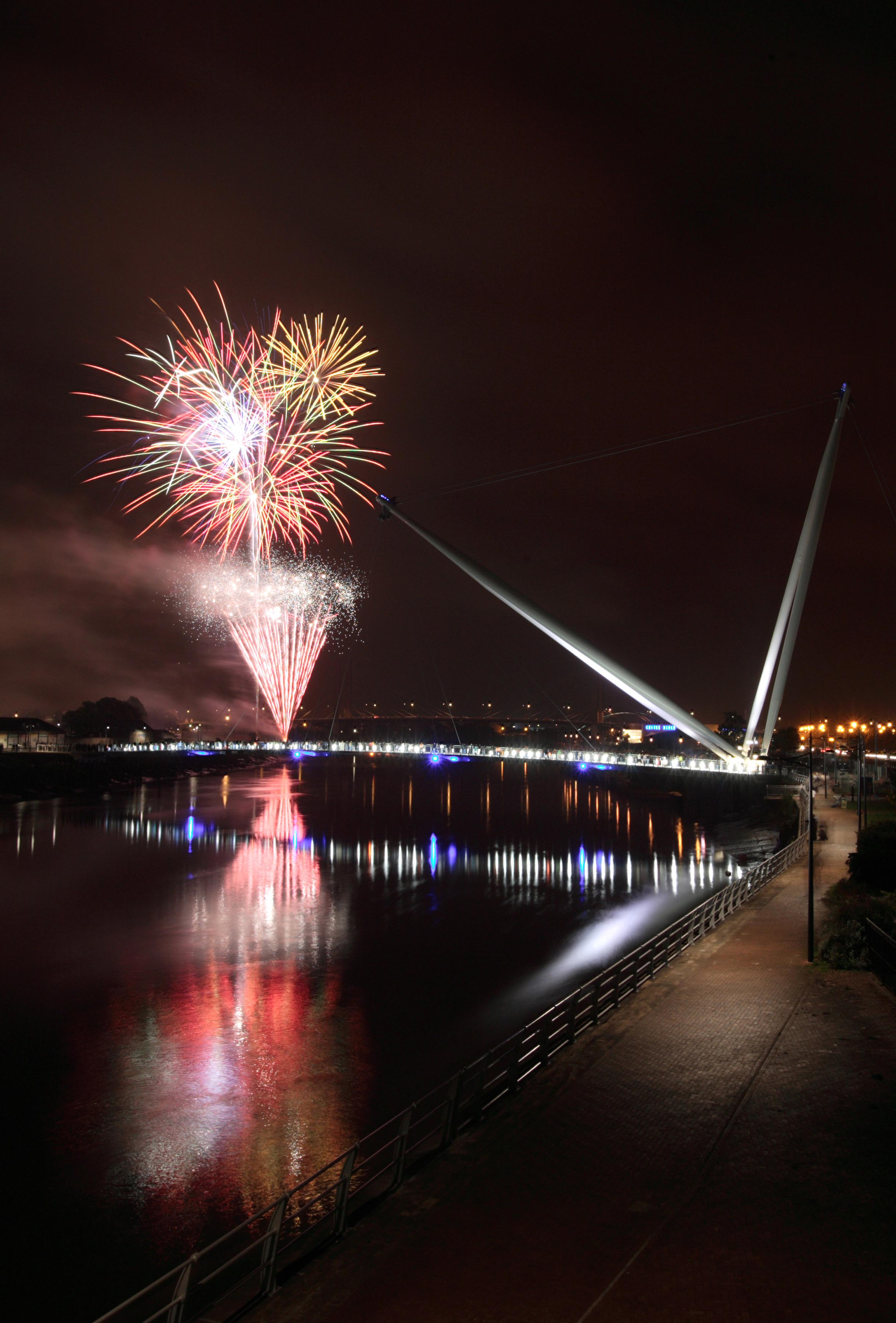
Usk footbridge opening

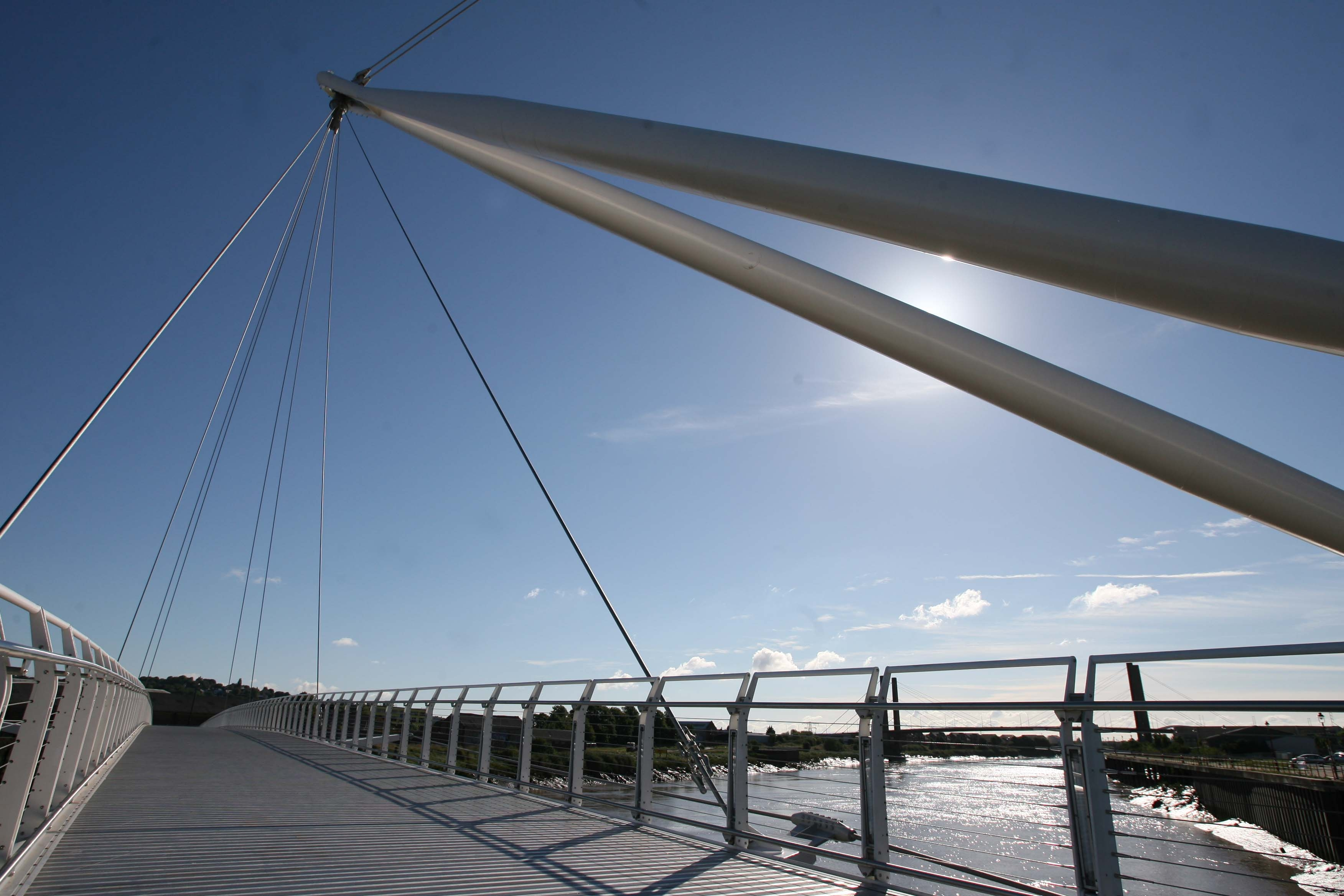
Usk footbridge masts

== Design concept ==
The dramatic crane structures were designed as a deliberate and symbolic link to the site's earlier use as trading wharves—but with a modern twist. The deliberate location of the main structures on the west bank means that the vast majority of the construction work was kept away from the houses on the east bank, while avoiding impact on the local river ecology.

== The foundations ==
The bridge foundations are supported by thirty 35 1/2 inches (900 mm) diameter CFA (continuous flight auger) piles varying in length. The bridge structure is suspended on five ground anchors which are drilled 98 ft (30 m) into the ground.

Approximately 600 m^{3} (780 cu yd) of concrete were used in the bridge foundations.

== The masts ==
The masts are made from sheet steel which was rolled into 'cans'. These were then welded together to produce the tubes for the masts.

The front mast is 2.5 m (8.2 ft) in diameter and was delivered to site in nine sections. It weighs approximately 275 long tons (279 t).

The back mast is 1.75 m (5.7 ft) diameter and was delivered to site in seven sections. It weighs approximately 177 long tons (180 t).

== The deck ==
The bridge deck is made up of five sections.

The deck units were installed in sequence and then welded together. Details of the deck units are shown below:

- Deck one and five
  - 79 ft (24 m) long
  - 16 ft (4.9 m) wide
  - weight 19 long tons (19 t)
- Deck two and four
  - 85 ft (26 m) long
  - 31.2 ft (9.5 m) wide (at the outriggers)
  - weight 25 long tons (25 t)
- Deck three
  - 118 ft (36 m) long
  - 49 ft (15 m) wide (at the outriggers)
  - weight 55 long tons (56 t)

== The cables ==
A half mile (800 m) of cable is used to support the bridge, varying in diameter from 2 in to 4¾ in (to 50 to 120 mm), made by Bridon Ropes of Doncaster.

== Erection ==
The main masts for the bridge were erected in the week commencing 1 May 2006 using the largest crane in the UK. It was officially opened on 12 September 2006 (also the centenary of Newport Transporter Bridge) and is the ninth crossing of the Usk in the city.

== Facts ==
- Maximum mast height: 229 ft (70 m).
- Mast weight: 836 long tons (849 t).
- The balustrades are formed from nearly two miles (three kilometres) of stainless steel wire.
- The bridge deck has 178 lights (89 on either side), illuminating the footpath.
- The masts, mast bases and back anchor are all illuminated by 36 floodlights and up-lighters.

== World record highwire walk ==
As part of the city's "Big Splash" festival, on 30 August 2010, 45-year-old French circus star Olivier Roustan from Toulouse, performed the highest ever wirewalk in Europe, along the top cable of the Newport City Footbridge.

== See also ==
- List of bridges in Wales
