= Hunslet Grange Flats =

Flat complex in Leeds, England

- Interactive map of Hunslet Grange Flats

General information
- Location: Hunslet, Leeds
- Coordinates: 53.77990°N 1.53105°W
- Status: Demolished
- No. of units: 350

Construction
- Constructed: 1967–1968
- Architect: Martin Richardson of The Yorkshire Development Group (YDG) and E. W. Stanley
- Contractors: Shepherd Construction
- Authority: Leeds City Council
- Style: Brutalism

Listing
- Demolished: 1983

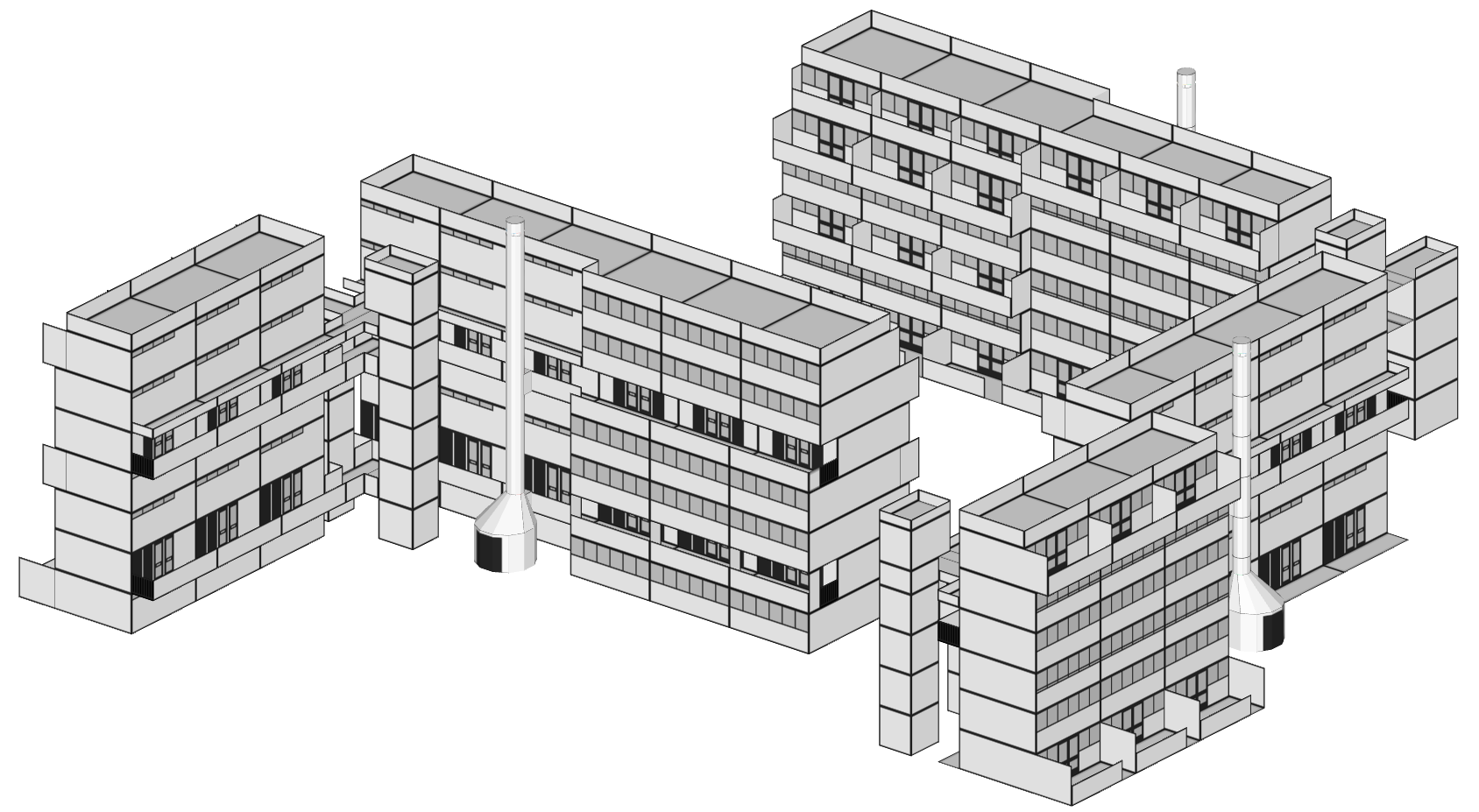
Blocks were often modular in design, and would typically consist of a "recessed" block to accommodate a refuse chute for residents, or a lift and stairwell, as shown above.

The Hunslet Grange Flats (colloquially known as the Leek Street Flats) was a complex of deck-accessed flats in Hunslet, Leeds.

== Design and construction ==
Slum clearances within much of Hunslet occurred mostly in the 1960s, which caused a mass scale of terraced housing, mostly back-to-backs to be demolished. In an effort to re-develop the area with new housing, the Leeds City Council commissioned a large high-rise complex designed by the Yorkshire Development Group that was to be built by Shepherd Construction. The development, which consisted of 350 flats and maisonettes, was completed in 1968.

The complex was designed in the style of so-called 'streets in the sky' with overhead walkways connecting blocks of five up to seven-storey maisonettes or flats together. The exteriors (excluding residents' entrances) of the entire complex were finished with pale grey pebble-dashed concrete panels. Specific "recessed" blocks of six or seven storey maisonettes had a rubbish disposal chute on each access floor leading to a cylindrical bin room at street level. Each of the flats and maisonettes were fitted with a two-bar electric wall heater in the sitting room, and a "Halcyon" warm-air heating system combined in a central plumbing, heating and electric core that ran up every storey within a single block. Twelve of the blocks were six storeys in height, and six blocks were of seven storeys, with the entrances of most maisonettes arranged to be either accessed on the ground or first floor of the complex. The estate covered a large area of Hunslet and was arranged in three clusters around a small park. Shops and a public house, "The Pioneer" made up part of the complex.

== Decline and demolition ==
The complex was at first popular with its tenants. However, this early popularity was short-lived. The warm-air heating systems in each home were inadequate for the poorly insulated concrete prefabricated buildings, and due to this the interiors suffered from condensation. This led to chronic fuel poverty among the inhabitants. Demolition of the complex started in 1983, less than fifteen years after the first tenants moved in.

While there were many complexes of similar layout and concept, the Broomhall Flats in Sheffield, Balloon Woods Flats in Nottingham, the Bransholme and Cavill Place Maisonettes, both in Kingston upon Hull were similar in design, construction and aesthetics. The flats and maisonettes, with the exception of Rossett House in Hull (to be demolished) were all demolished in the late 1980s having suffered similar problems to Hunslet Grange. Like Hunslet Grange, these were also designed by the Yorkshire Development Group.

== Hunslet Green ==
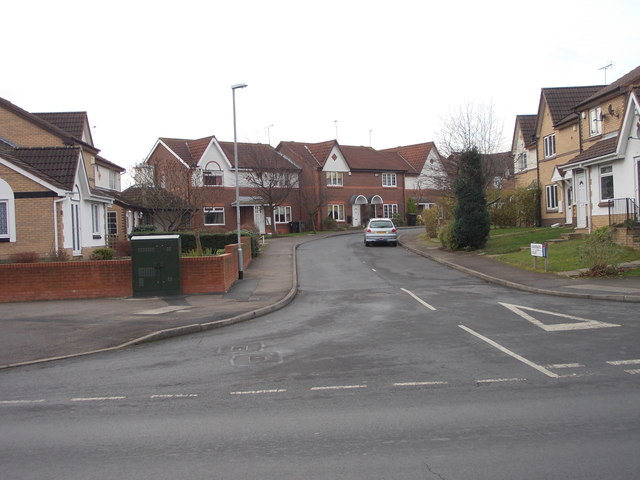
Gardeners Court showing new housing which has replaced Hunslet Grange

The site was redeveloped by Leeds Development Corporation as Hunslet Green in the early 1990s. Today it consists of low-rise housing, the Hunslet Green Community Sports Club and a small business park. The only remnant of the Hunslet Grange Flats is an electrical substation which remains on the Oval.

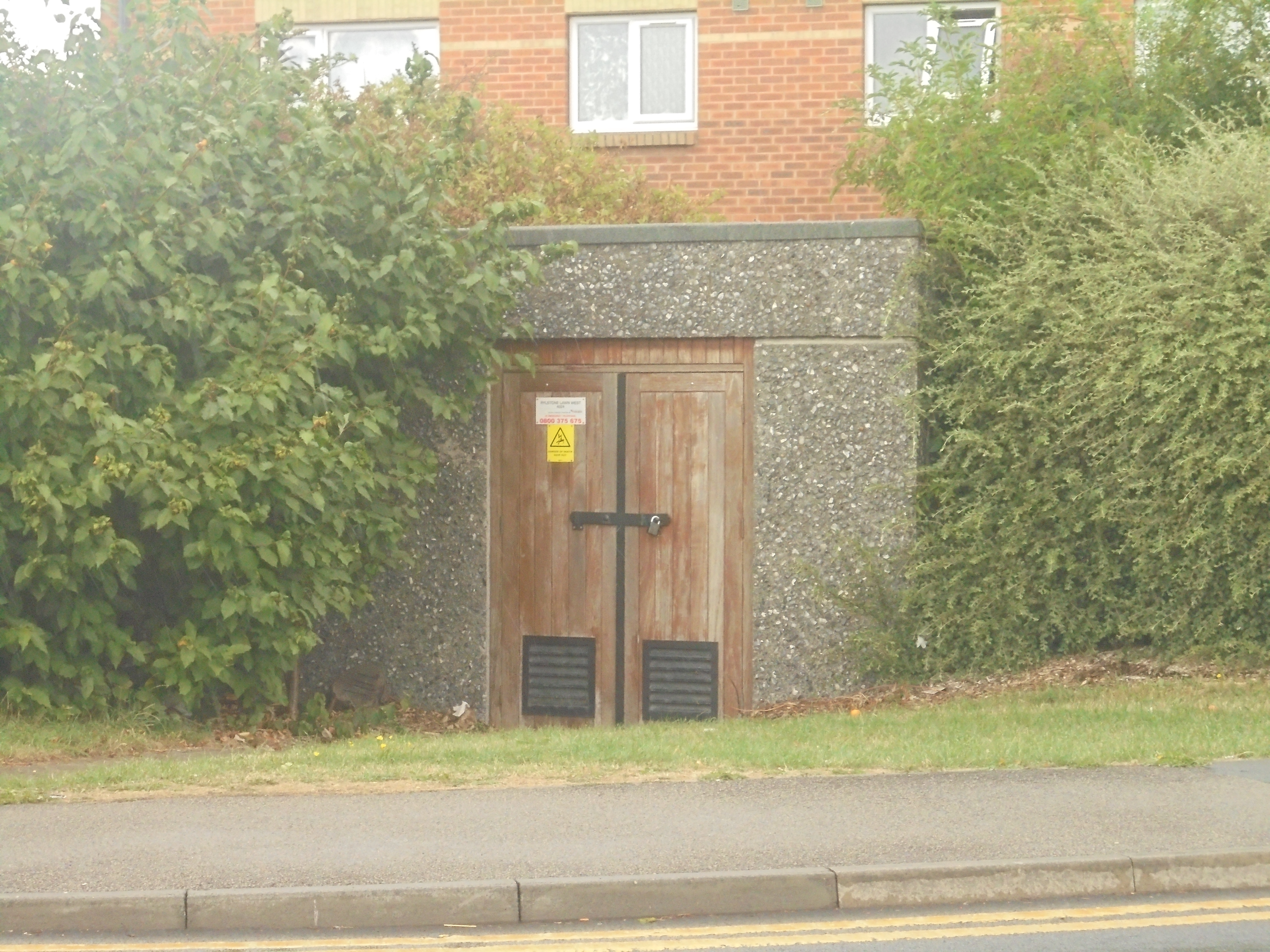
Remaining electrical substation showing the building materials used in the complex.

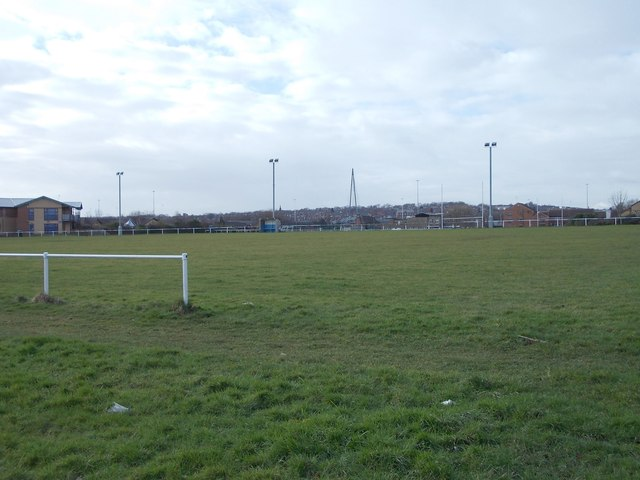
Playing fields occupying the former site

== See also ==
- Hulme Crescents
- Park Hill, Sheffield
- Robin Hood Gardens
