= Rowecord Engineering =

Former Welsh structural steel contractor

Rowecord Engineering Ltd
- Company type: Private company
- Industry: Construction
- Founded: 1967
- Founder: Benjamin Finley Hoppé OBE
- Fate: Administration (2013)
- Headquarters: Neptune Works, Newport
- Area served: UK
- Products: Structural steel fabrication; Structural steel erection
- Parent: Rowecord Holdings Ltd (from 1993)

Rowecord Engineering Ltd was a Welsh structural steel contractor that specialised in sports facilities, footbridges, and heavy industry. Landmark works include the Olympic Aquatics Centre roof, Mary Rose Museum, Cardiff City Stadium, Liberty Stadium and Newport City footbridge.

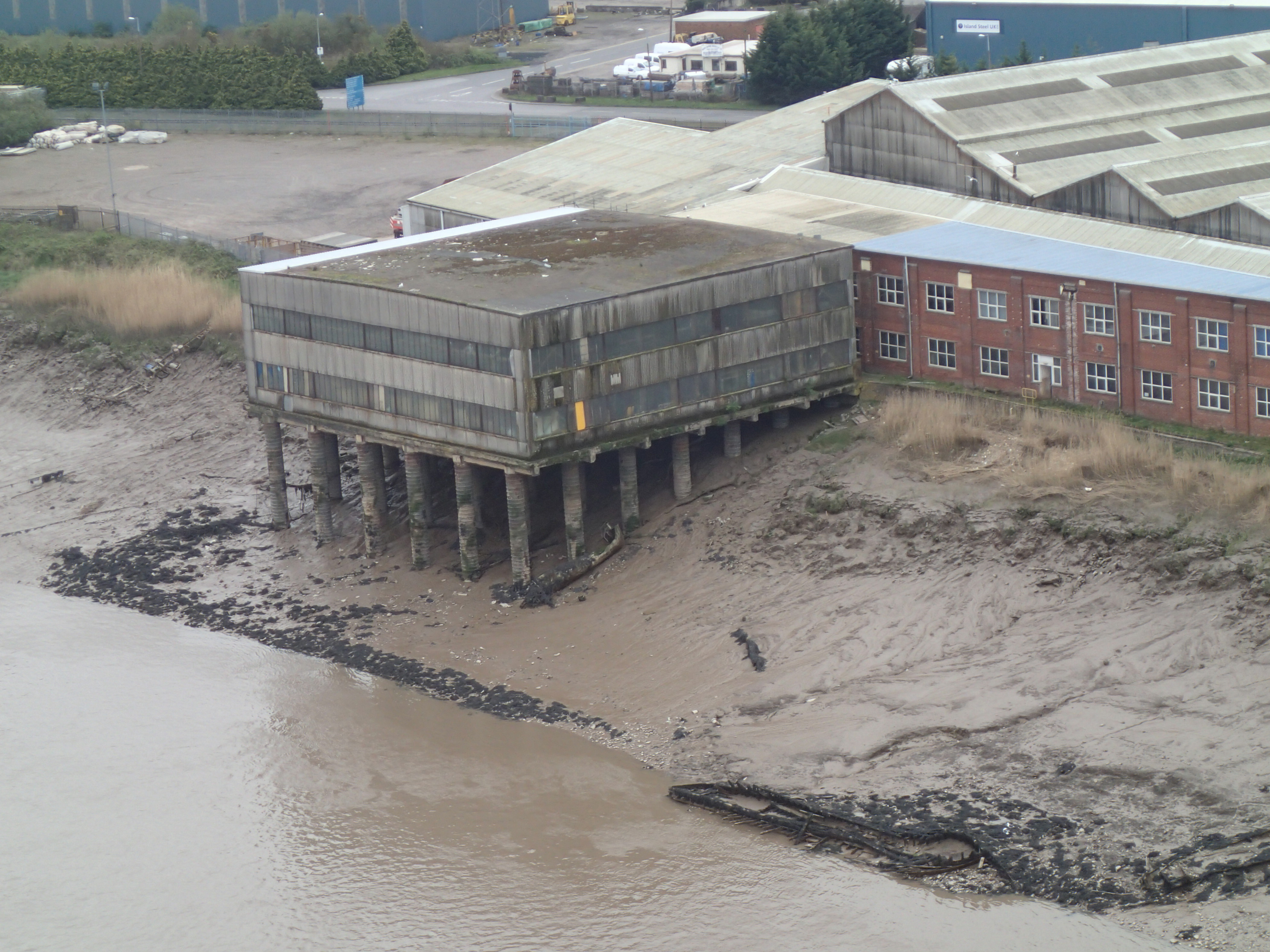
Neptune Works overhanging the River Usk

Neptune Works, its former headquarters, is partly built over the River Usk.

== History ==
=== Origin ===
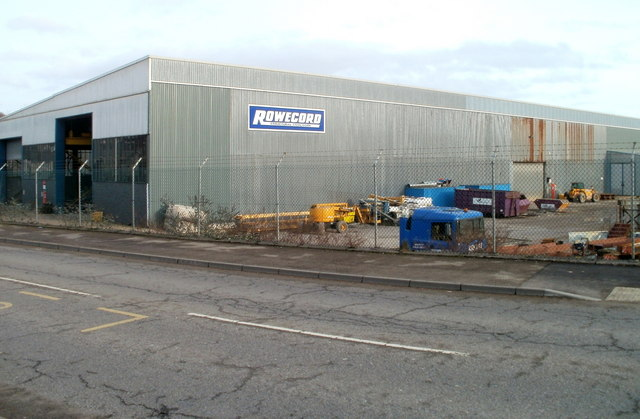
Rowecord, Risca - 2011

Rowecord Engineering Ltd was incorporated by Benjamin Hoppé in 1967 to carry out structural steel fabrication and erection.

1987 turnover was £7.3 million with 156 staff and by 1988 the Company had subsidiaries specialising in steelworks coal handling plant, and marketing industrial equipment. The acquisition of Braithwaite assets that year added capabilities in fluid storage systems including modular, pressed steel tanks. The transaction increased capacity for steel fabrication and existing Rowecord businesses moved down the River Usk from Old Town Docks to Braithwaite's Neptune Works.

During 1993 the business re-organised. Rowecord Engineering Ltd and its subsidiaries each became directly owned by the Hoppé family's newly incorporated Rowecord Holdings Ltd. Twenty years later that put the other businesses out of reach of Rowecord Engineering Ltd's creditors. Group turnover was £18.6 million with 335 staff in 1993.

Group turnover peaked at £133 million in 2013. There had been over a thousand employees in 2012, and Rowecord Engineering Ltd accounted for approximately half of group staff and turnover.

=== Fate ===
Grant Thornton was appointed Administrator to Rowecord Engineering Ltd in 2013; 425 workers were immediately made redundant, with 82 retained to complete contracts and assist Administration. Projects including an extension for the British Museum; blast furnace works at Port Talbot for Tata Steel, and a coal injection plant for SSI at Redcar were interrupted. The situation was attributed to an anticipated £12 million cash shortfall and lack of new orders. A £5 million loan offered by the Welsh Government, and commercial settlements with customers, had been insufficient to prevent Administration. Purchasers were not initially forthcoming for the business. The Administrator completed viable contracts by either appointing agents to carry out the work; transferring them to Rowecord group companies, or negotiating exits. Administration became Liquidation in 2014. Creditors suffered a £29 million loss.

=== Aftermath ===
The holding company, Neptune Works and fellow subsidiaries survived. Those were Andrew Scott Ltd (civil engineering and construction), Braithwaite Engineering Ltd (pressed steel tanks), Industrial Planners and Constructors Ltd (valve distribution) and Rowecord Total Access Ltd (scaffolding).

The interest in Neptune Works was sold by Rowecord Holdings Ltd during 2014, and remaining subsidiaries moved out. Braithwaite Engineers Ltd resumed structural steel fabrication at Risca in 2016 but in 2019 sold that site and structural steel fabrication business to William Hare Group. Braithwaite retained its pressed steel fluid storage product range.

Benjamin Findley Hoppé was awarded an OBE in 2003 for services to the Steel Construction Industry, and died in 2017.

== Neptune Works ==
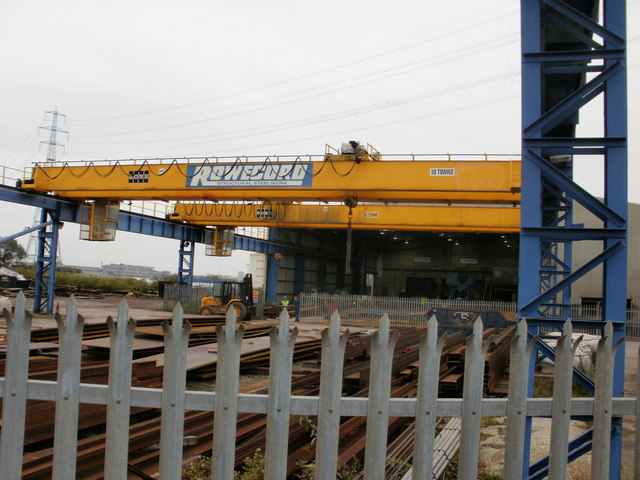
Neptune Works, 2009

Braithwaite and Kirk established Neptune Works beside the River Usk c. 1913 because it had better transport links than their original West Bromwich premises. The plant was subsequently operated by Braithwaite & Co Engineers Ltd / Braithwaite & Co Structural Ltd which was purchased by Dorman Long in 1921. It produced structural steelwork, transmission towers, bridgework, pressed steel tanks, sectional pontoons and foundation cylinders there.

Rowecord Engineering Ltd acquired Braithwaite's assets in 1988 and moved to Neptune Works. Following the failure of Rowecord Engineering Ltd in 2013, and the Rowecord Holdings Ltd sale of its interest in the Works in 2014, the remainder of the Rowecord group left.

Neptune Works was briefly brought back into production by Saudi Arabian Attieh Group backed AIC Steel UK Ltd in 2014. It had purchased assets from Rowecord but, after 2015 restructuring and redundancies, it too appointed an Administrator in 2016.

Associated British Ports purchased the 9.5 acres (3.8 ha) site in 2018 and leased parts out.

A proposal to replace Neptune Works with a visitor centre to serve the nearby Newport Transporter Bridge was made in 2022.

51.5690°N 2.9877°W

== Notable projects ==
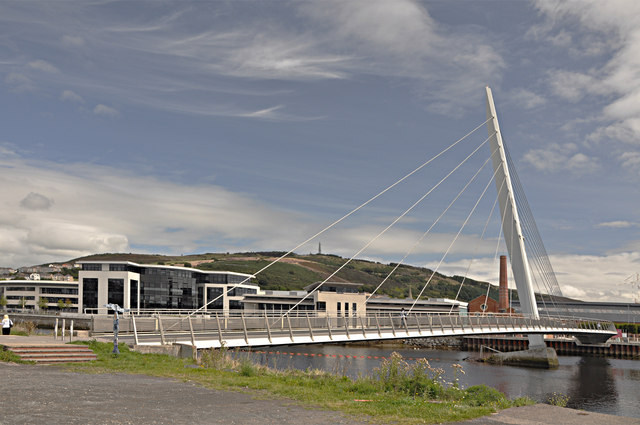
Sail Bridge, Swansea

- Paddington Crossrail Station, London
- Peterborough City Hospital
- Roath Lock Bridge, Porth Teigr
- Cardiff City Stadium
- Olympic Aquatics Centre roof, London
- Mary Rose Museum, Portsmouth
- Liberty Stadium, Swansea
- Parc y Scarlets, Llanelli
- Stadium MK, Milton Keynes
- SWALEC Stadium, Swansea
- Forthside Footbridge, Stirling
- Newport City Footbridge
- Peace Bridge, Derry
- National Tennis Centre, Roehampton
- Wales National Pool, Cardiff
- Media City Footbridge, Salford

== See also ==
- British Constructional Steelwork Association
- Redpath Dorman Long
- Cleveland Bridge & Engineering Company
- Severfield
- William Hare Group
