= David Hodgkiss =

British cricket chairman

- Born: June 1948
- Died: 29 March 2020 (aged 71)
- Education: Repton School
- Alma mater: University of Liverpool
- Occupations: Businessman; Cricket Administrator
- Known for: Chairman of Lancashire County Cricket Club
- Awards: OBE

David Michael William Hodgkiss OBE (June 1948 – 29 March 2020) was a British businessman, and Chairman of Lancashire County Cricket Club between April 2017 and March 2020.

He was Chief Executive of structural steel contractor William Hare Group, a business founded by his grandfather. Hodgkiss's 2014 OBE was awarded for services to manufacturing and export at William Hare.

Hodgkiss served over twenty years at Lancashire County Cricket Club as Committee Member (1998 - 2003), Treasurer (2003 - 2013), Vice-Chairman (2013 - 2017) and Chairman (2017 - 2020), being instrumental in completing a £60 million redevelopment of the Club's Old Trafford Cricket Ground.

He died age 71 in March 2020 after catching COVID-19. The England Cricket Team took to the field against the West Indies at Emirates Old Trafford wearing black armbands in his honour. Farokh Engineer lauded Hodgkiss as the best and the most popular Chairman Lancashire County Cricket Club ever had.
