= Howard Bernstein =

British civil servant (1953–2024)

Sir Howard Bernstein
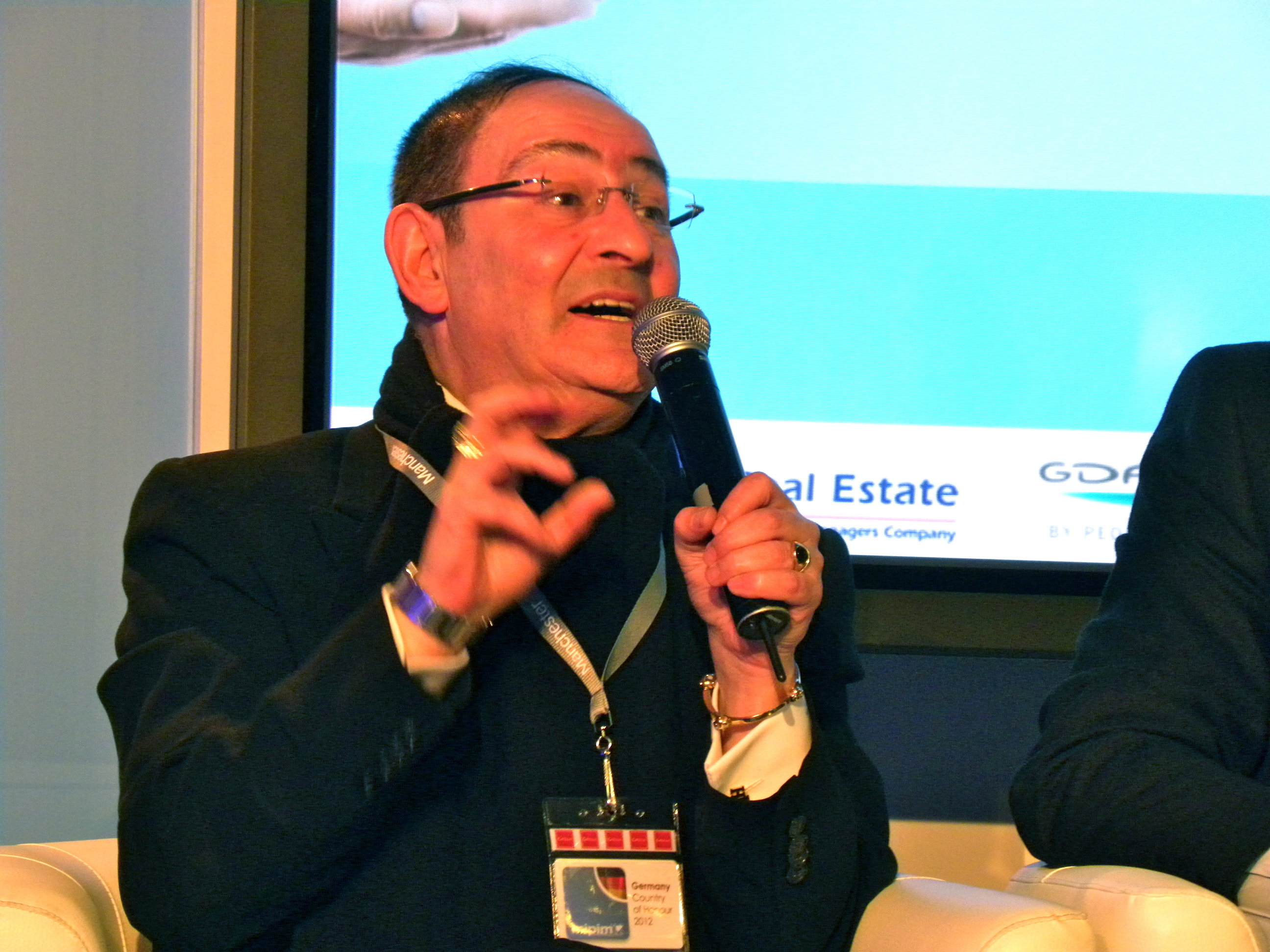
- Bernstein in 2012

Chief executive of Manchester City Council
- In office 1998 – 31 March 2017
- Monarch: Elizabeth II
- Prime Minister: Tony Blair; Gordon Brown; David Cameron; Theresa May
- Succeeded by: Joanne Roney

Personal details
- Born: Howard Bernstein; 9 April 1953 Cheetham, Manchester, England
- Died: 22 June 2024 (aged 71)
- Spouse: Vanessa (m. 2004)
- Education: Ducie High School

Sir Howard Bernstein (9 April 1953 – 22 June 2024) was a British local government officer who was the chief executive of Manchester City Council from 1998 to 2017. After joining the Council as a junior clerk, he became the chief executive in 1998, responsible for setting development goals and encouraging investment in the city. He served as honorary professor of Politics at the University of Manchester. In a Harvard University interview in 2022 when asked what was the most important factor in his work, he said, "it’s the whole concept of place leadership."

== Early life and education ==
Bernstein was Jewish. He was born on 9 April 1953 in Cheetham Hill, and attended the Ducie High School in Moss Side, which closed in 2003.

== Career ==
Before appointment as chief executive, Bernstein headed up the Special Projects Group within Manchester City Council amongst other roles, and along with his role as Clerk to the Greater Manchester Passenger Transport Authority (GMPTA) he championed the Manchester Metrolink system. The system became the first light-rail network to be built in a British city for over a century when it opened in the early 1990s.

Bernstein also supported the creation of new areas and buildings such as the Bridgewater Hall, the Manchester Velodrome, the Manchester Arena, the City of Manchester Stadium and the Sportcity district in east Manchester which is still growing. He was involved in the establishment of the Manchester Airports Group (MAG) in the mid-1980s and drove the expansion of the company. MAG is now the largest British owned airports group in the UK, owning three airports.

Bernstein's appointment followed the 1996 Manchester bombing which severely damaged much of the city centre and extensive reconstruction ensued. He was appointed Chief executive of Manchester Millennium Limited, the public/private sector task force set up by the Government and the City Council to oversee the redesign and rebuilding of the City Centre, a task which successfully delivered areas such as Piccadilly Gardens, Exchange Square, New Cathedral Street, Urbis on time and on budget.

In 2003, Manchester City Council under Bernstein's civic leadership won the RIBA Client of the Year for various projects such the City of Manchester Stadium and Urbis – the only time a local government authority has won the award.

He was reckoned by the Health Service Journal to be the 21st most influential person in the National Health Service in 2015 as a result of his central involvement in the reform of Healthcare in Greater Manchester. In March 2016 he was appointed the leader of the Greater Manchester Sustainability and transformation plan footprint. Later the same year, he announced his intention to retire in Spring 2017, his final day was 31 March 2017. He was succeeded by Joanne Roney in April 2017. He was made Honorary Professor of Politics at The University of Manchester on 3 April 2017.

In 2017, Bernstein was appointed Strategic Development Advisor at City Football Group, Manchester City F.C.'s parent company.

=== Awards and honours ===
Bernstein was appointed Knight Bachelor "for services to the reconstruction of Manchester and the XVII Commonwealth Games" in the 2003 New Year Honours following the successful hosting of the 2002 Commonwealth Games in Manchester.

Bernstein held several honorary degrees, including from University of Manchester Institute of Science and Technology (UMIST), University of Manchester, and Manchester Metropolitan University. In 2017, he joined the University of Manchester as an honorary professor of politics.

Bernstein was a member of the Olympic Delivery Authority, the body responsible for the delivery of venues in time for the 2012 Summer Olympics in London. He served as president of Lancashire County Cricket Club and one of six honorary presidents of Manchester City F.C. He was a vice-president of the Jewish Leadership Council.

== Personal life and death ==
Bernstein's hobbies included sport, especially cricket and football. He died on 22 June 2024, at the age of 71.

Bernstein lived in Prestwich until his death and was survived by his wife, Vanessa, whom he married in 2004, two children and three stepchildren.
