= Forthside Bridge =

Bridge in the Stirling, Scotland

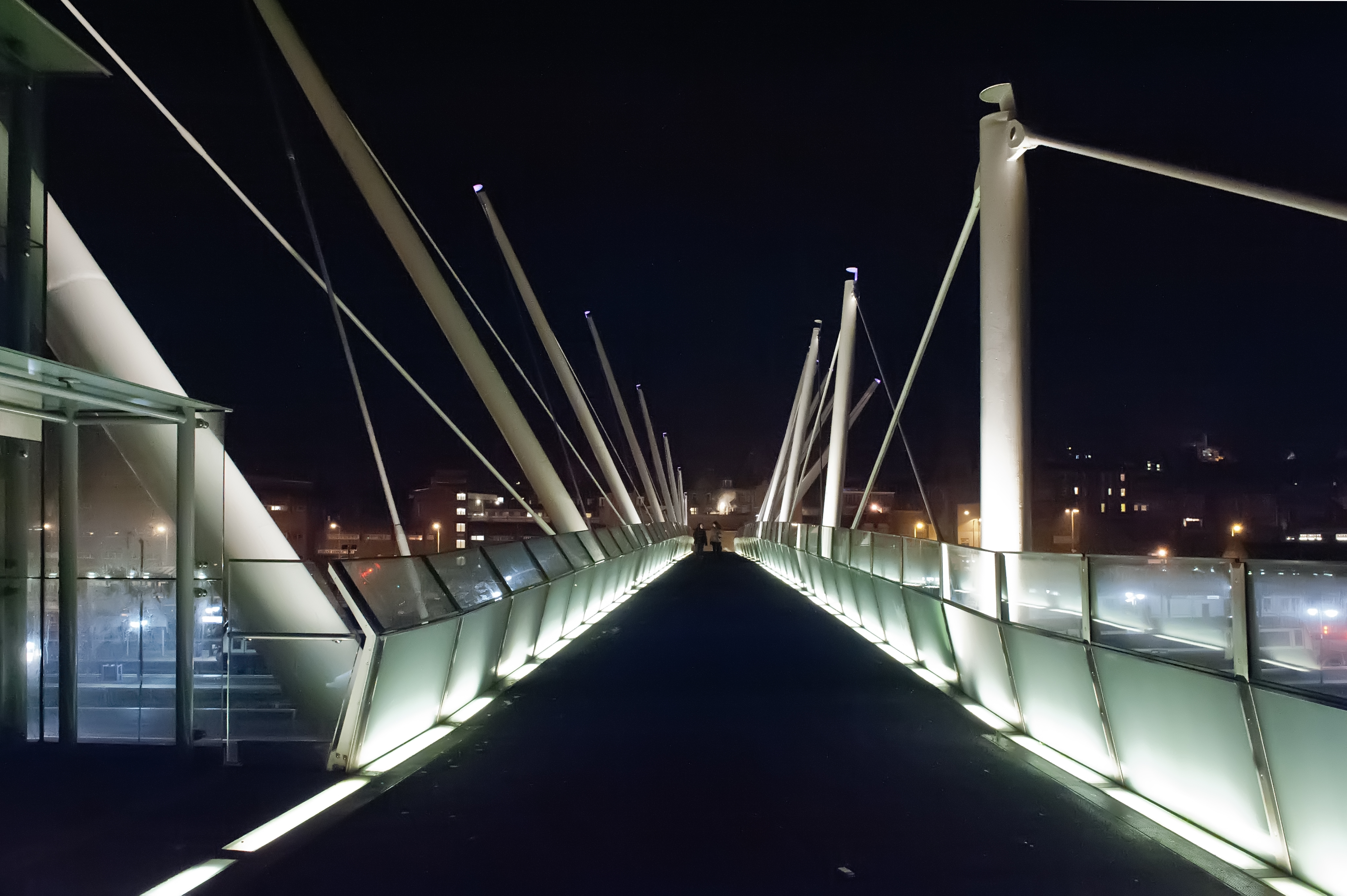
- Coordinates: 56°7′8.04″N 3°56′6.36″W
- Carries: Pedestrian Bridge
- Crosses: Stirling railway station
- Locale: Stirling
- Other names: Spiky Bridge; Forthside Footbridge
- Named for: River Forth
- Owner: Stirling Council

Characteristics
- Design: Cable-stayed
- Material: Steel
- Total length: 113 m (371 ft)
- Width: 4 m (13 ft)
- Longest span: 88.2 m (289 ft)

History
- Designer: Gifford; WilkinsonEyre; BAM Nuttall; Rowecord Engineering
- Construction cost: £6.5 Million
- Opened: 2 May 2009

Location
- Interactive map of Forthside Bridge

Forthside Bridge (often referred to as Spiky Bridge) is a large pedestrian bridge located in the city of Stirling, in the Central Belt of Scotland. Opened on 2 May 2009, the bridge crosses Stirling railway station, a busy interchange station located on the former Caledonian Main Line and connects the city centre with the Forthside Development, a £90 million residential and leisure area on the banks of the River Forth.

A form of Inverted Fink truss bridge, similar to the Royal Victoria Dock Bridge in London, the construction costs of the Forthside Bridge were estimated at around £6.5 Million. Since its completion, the bridge has become a local landmark and has been praised for its design, receiving a commendation from the Institution of Structural Engineers in 2010.

== History and Design ==
The bridge was constructed as part of the 40-acre Forthside Development plan, an urban regeneration project from Stirling Council, located around the former Forthside Barracks. Construction of the £6.5 million bridge was carried out by Edmund Nuttall Group alongside architects Gifford and WilkinsonEyre. Funding for the project was given by the Scottish Government, alongside the European Regional Development Fund. Due to the bridge's complex design, opening plans faced numerous delays and was originally scheduled to open in November 2008.

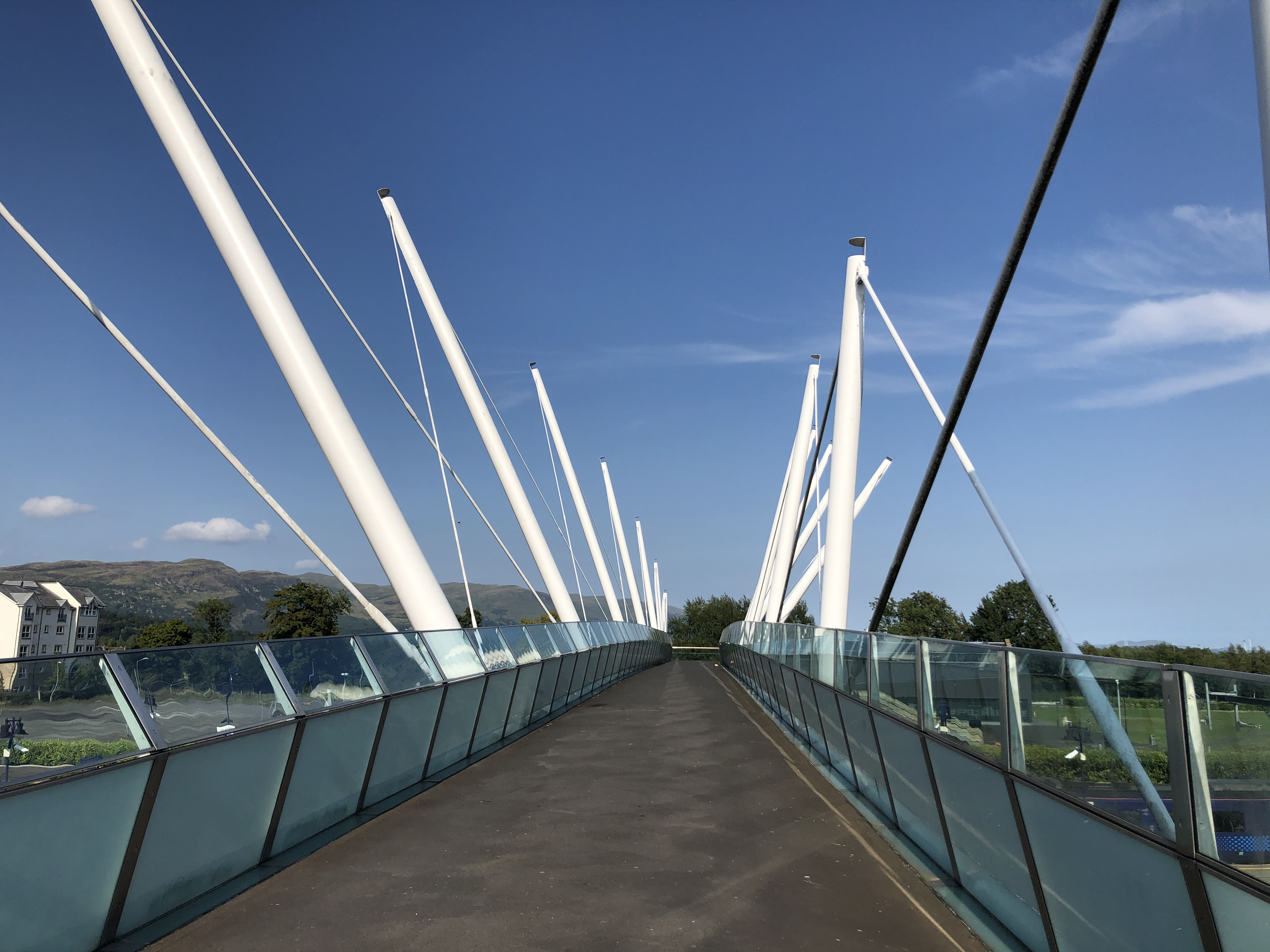
Forthside Bridge in August 2020.

The bridge is around 113m long, stands around 6m from the ground and is a unique form of inverted Fink truss with its longest span of 88.2m, over numerous mainline rail tracks of Stirling Station. Glass parapets are fitted along the path over the bridge, which are illuminated at night. For ease of access, the bridge has lifts at either end.

== Opening ==
The bridge opened to the general public on 2 May 2009 and, as a publicity stunt, Stirling Council recruited 6 members of the public named William Wallace to open the bridge.

== Vandalism ==
Since opening, the bridge has suffered numerous acts of vandalism such as graffiti, anti-social behaviour and damage to bridge facilities. During the bridge's initial years, the access lifts were closed for almost three years after persistent damage. The Stirling Observer (Daily Record) received information that "following damage to the lift and glass panels CCTV cameras costing £1031 were installed."

== See also ==
- List of bridges in Scotland
