= British Constructional Steelwork Association =

Trade association for the UK and Ireland structural steel industry

BCSA Ltd
- Nickname: British Constructional Steelwork Association
- Formation: April 1, 1936; 90 years ago
- Type: Trade association
- Legal status: Private company limited by guarantee
- Purpose: Inform, liaise and promote the structural steel industry
- Headquarters: Whitehall Court, London
- Coordinates: 51.5054°N 0.12436°W
- Region served: UK and Ireland
- Members: Structural steel industry
- Key people: Dr David Moore (Chief Executive); Mark Denham (Chairman)
- Publication: New Steel Construction
- Subsidiaries: Steel Construction Certification Scheme Ltd; British Constructional Steelwork Association Ltd; Steel for Life Ltd
- Affiliations: Build UK; Confederation of British Industry; Construction Industry Collective Voice; Steel Construction Institute (Note: The Steel Construction Institute is an independent UK body but members of the association are as of 2022, also members of the institute); UK Metals Council
- Revenue: ▲£3.2 million (2021)
- Staff: ▼13 (2021)
- Website: steelconstruction.org

BCSA Ltd is a trade association for the structural steel industry in the UK and Ireland. It lobbies on behalf of its members, and provides them with education and technical services.

A subsidiary, Steel Construction Certification Scheme Ltd, runs the UKAS accredited Steel Construction Certificate Scheme (SCCS). It provides certification for steelwork contracting organisations under ISO 9001, ISO 3834, ISO 14001 and ISO 45001.

The association, its marketing initiative Steel for Life Ltd, and the Steel Construction Institute manage online resource, Steel Construction Info.

In addition to London headquarters, it maintains offices near Doncaster Sheffield Airport.

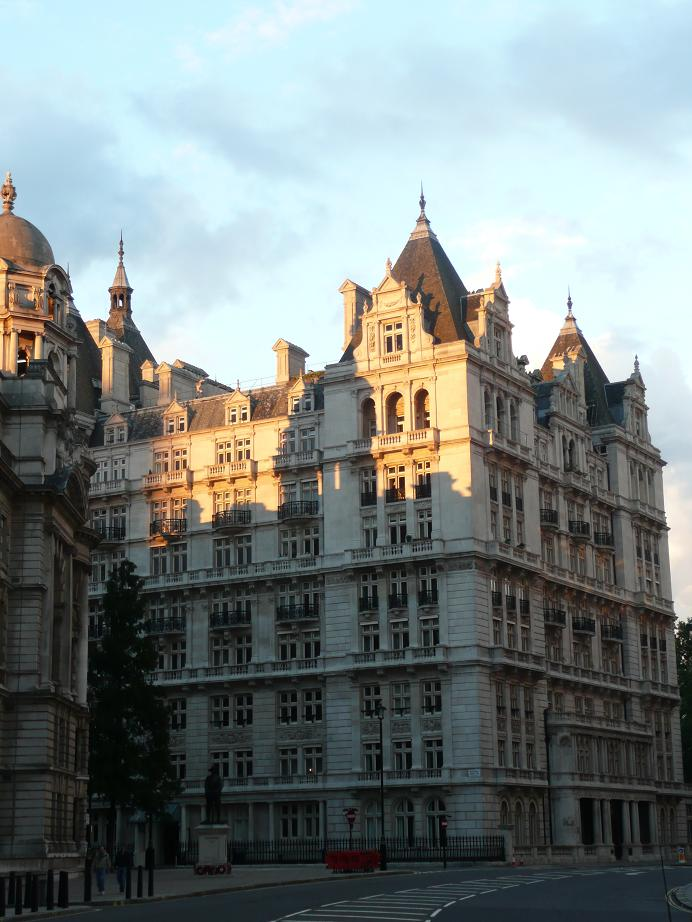
Whitehall Court

== History ==
The association arose from a series of mergers involving regional and sector specific associations.

Five steelwork contractors in Manchester began to collaborate in 1906, and then formally established the Steelwork Society in 1908. The Rules were only finalised in 1911. Steel producers had benefited from trade associations as a forum to collude on pricing, and steelwork contractors sought the same advantages.

Similar groups established themselves around the country, and joint meetings were held. In the early 1930s the British Steelwork Association operated from London as a national, federated association funded by, and representing, the local associations.

The British Constructional Steelwork Association was formed, in 1936, to succeed the British Steelwork Association. In return for recognition from the steel manufacturers in raw material negotiations, their fabrication subsidiaries were permitted to join the new association. Membership immediately jumped from 92 to 159.

In 1966 The British Constructional Steelwork Association Ltd incorporated to take over all the activities of the British Constructional Steelwork Association, Bridge and Constructional Ironwork Association, London Constructional Engineers Association, Midland Structural Association, Scottish Structural Steel Association, Steelwork Society, Northern Ireland Steelwork Association, and Structural Export Association.

The name changed to BCSA Ltd in 1990 though it commonly operates under the name of a subsidiary called the British Constructional Steelwork Association Ltd, incorporated at that time.

Membership of the association was initially limited to structural steel contractors until in 1987, other companies that shared the association's objects began to be admitted as associates. The rules of the association were amended accordingly in 1994.

The British Constructional Steelwork Association Ltd purchased a 99 year lease on its Whitehall Court headquarters in 1989 for £610,000. It previously operated from nearby premises at 35 Old Queen Street.

== Price fixing ==
Collusion on pricing had been an important part of early trade associations in the iron and steel industries. Trade associations of structural steel contractors were no different, and even then this was controversial. The British Constructional Steelwork Association identify instances of members of their predecessor organisations, cautious about the legality of these schemes, hiding behind code names and numbers.

Association practice was to share tender lists for contracts, and where that consisted wholly of members, to add 1/4% to the tender price of the chosen contractor, to be shared amongst the other members on the tender list. During the 1920s, economic pressures encouraged almost all structural steel contractors to join the associations. Tenders were routinely member only, significantly curtailing competition. Some contractors were alleged to have joined tender lists with no intention of bidding, merely to claim their share of the 1/4%.

Government imposed prohibitive tariffs on imported fabricated steel in 1932. Real competition to the structural steel contractors came only from domestic steel manufacturers with their own, in house, fabrication capability, and emerging construction techniques with reinforced concrete. The 1936 arrangement to admit fabrication subsidiaries of steel manufacturers to the association drew them also into the cartel.

During the Second World War the Ministry of Supply enforced control on maximum structural steel prices through an Iron and Steel Control department.

Post war, it was common for structural steel contractors to submit identical bids in response to tenders. Government became more concerned with anti-competitive behaviour, and the structural steel industry's highly developed, overt bid rigging received particular attention. The Monopolies and Restrictive Practices Commission launched an investigation and the industry was required to register its practices under the Restrictive Trade Practices Act 1956. Registration provided for further scrutiny.

The Registrar promptly challenged restrictions on trade, and price fixing, imposed by the British Constructional Steelwork Association upon its members, under the new Restrictive Practices Court Act 1958. Judgement rejected arguments the measures offered useful protections and held them to be void. The association undertook thenceforth to engage only in co-operation between its members, rather than price fixing and collusion.

In 1995, the association launched their Register of Qualified Steelwork Contractors with a stated aim to readily enable identification of appropriate steelwork contractors, and thereby ensure competition takes place.

== Structural Steel Design Awards ==
In 1969 the association set up its Structural Steel Design Awards. Recent recipients include:

Year	Structure	Architect	Steel contractor
2008	Unilever House Renovation	Kohn Pedersen Fox	William Hare
2008	The O2 Arena	HOK Sports	Severfield
2009	Cabot Circus roof	Chapman Taylor Benoy	S H Structures
2009	Kew Treetop Walkway	Marks Barfield	W S Britland
2010	Infinity Bridge	Expedition Engineering	Cleveland Bridge
2010	London Aquatics Centre roof	Zaha Hadid	Rowecord
2011	Prologis Park	Stephen George & Partners	Barret Steel Buildings
2011	Falmer Stadium	KSS Design Group	Severfield
2012	Olympic Stadium	Populous	Severfield
2012	Peace Bridge	Wilkinson Eyre	Rowecord
2013	Air W1	Dixon Jones	William Hare
2013	Twin Sails Bridge	Wilkinson Eyre	Cleveland Bridge
2014	The Kelpies	Scott Sculptures (Note: Sculptor)	S H Structures
2014	Splashpoint Leisure Centre	Wilkinson Eyre	Severfield
2015	Derby Arena	FaulknerBrowns	Billington Structures
2015	Merchant Square Footbridge	Knight Architects	S H Structures
2016	Thames Tower (Note: Redevelopment, Reading)	dn-a	Shipley Structures
2016	Memorial Spire	PLACE	S H Structures
2017	The Leadenhall Building	Rogers Stirk Harbour + Partners	Severfield
2017	Oriam	Reiach and Hall Architects	J & D Pierce
2018	JLR Engine Manufacturing Centre	Arup	Severfield
2018	Bloomberg London	Foster and Partners	William Hare
2019	Taplow Riverside Footbridge	Knight Architects	S H Structures
2019	Tottenham Hotspur Stadium	Populous	Severfield
2020	52 Lime Street	Kohn Pedersen Fox	William Hare
2020	Tintagel Footbridge	Ney Architects	Underhill
2021	Glasgow Queen Street Station	BDP and IDP	J & D Pierce
2021	100 Liverpool Street	Hopkins Architects	William Hare
2022	Compton and Edrich Stands, Lord's	Wilkinson Eyre	Severfield
2022	Bombardier maintenance hangar, Biggin Hill	Civils Contracting	Reid Steel
2023	Battersea Power Station	Wilkinson Eyre	William Hare
2023	Stockingfield Bridge	Jacobs Solutions	S H Structures
2024	8 Bishopsgate	Wilkinson Eyre	William Hare
2024	Co-op Live	Populous	Severfield

== Coat of arms ==
The association was granted a coat of arms in 1987. The shield is a helmet on a background of red lines representing a framework of girders, and the crest is a red lion symbolising the strength of steel, and also British nationality. The lion is dotted with gold bezants representing fair dealing in commerce; the yellow, blazing torch, held aloft by the lion, represents the association's enlightening message that structures should be of steel not concrete, and the crest, atop a red and gold torse, is set within a circle of steel ingots.

The motto depicted on the arms is Strength and Stability, intended as reference to both the association and structural steel.

The crest is used in the association's logo.

== Membership ==
=== Full members ===
Full members are contractors that pay a levy to the association based on their sales of relevant steelwork in the prior year.

Present full members include:

- Severfield
- William Hare Group

Past full members include:

- Cleveland Bridge & Engineering Company
- Rowecord Engineering
- Dorman Long (Bridge and Engineering)
- William Baird & Co (Structural)
- Butterley Engineering Co
- Redpath Brown & Co

=== Industry members ===
Industry members are suppliers to structural steel contractors, and others with an interest in the industry's operation.

Recent industry members include:

- Metsec
- Hadley Group
- Rainham Steel
- ArcelorMittal
- Klöckner
- Skanska Cementation
- National Highways
- International Paint
- Sherwin-Williams
- Tekla
- Lincoln Electric
- Air Products
- British Steel
- Tata Steel
- Autodesk
- Kingspan

== See also ==
- British Iron and Steel Federation
