= Leeds Development Corporation =

British public organisation

- Formation: 1988
- Dissolved: 1995
- Headquarters: Leeds
- Chair: Peter Hartley CBE
- Chief executive: Martin Eagland

The Leeds Development Corporation was established in 1988 to develop South Central Leeds and the Kirkstall Valley.

== History ==
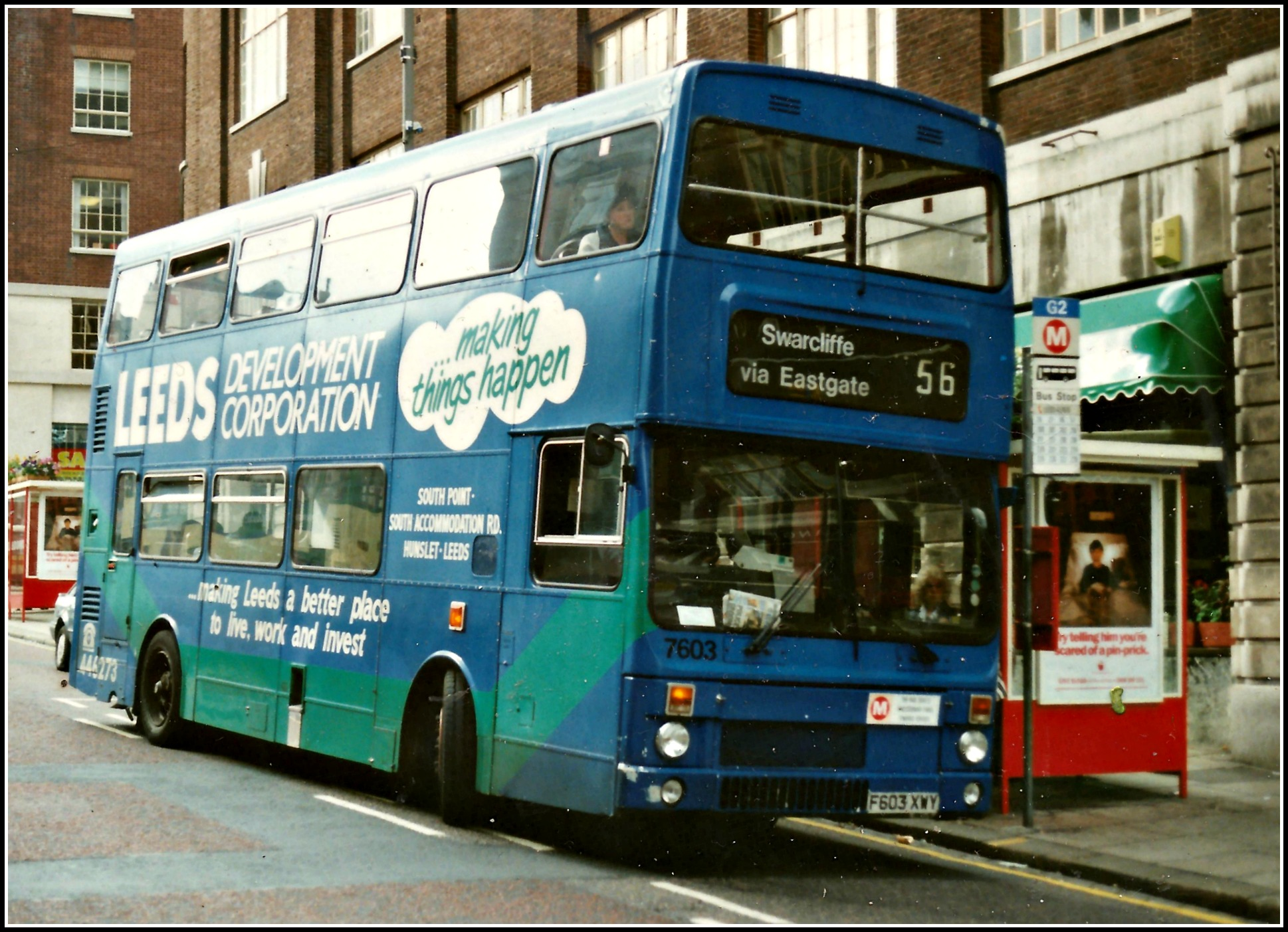
Leeds Development Corporation advertised on the side of a Yorkshire Rider bus on Eastgate in the 1990s

The corporation was established as part of an initiative by the future Deputy Prime Minister, Michael Heseltine, in 1988 during the Third Thatcher ministry. Board members were directly appointed by the minister and overrode local authority planning controls to spend government money on infrastructure. This was a controversial measure in Labour strongholds such as East London, Merseyside and North East England.

The corporation's area comprised the former industrial area of South Central Leeds and the site of a former power station in Kirkstall Valley. The corporation faced some opposition in its work at the former power station from the Kirkstall Valley campaign.

Its flagship developments included the Royal Armouries Museum at Clarence Dock and the Hunslet Green housing development. During its lifetime 4,100,000 square feet (380,000 m^{2}) of non-housing development and 571 housing units were built. Around 9,066 new jobs were created and some £357 million of private finance was leveraged in. Around 168 acres (0.68 km^{2}) of derelict land was reclaimed and 7.2 miles (11.6 km) of new road and footpaths put in place.

The Chairman was Peter Hartley CBE and the Chief Executive was Martin Eagland. The Executive Directors were Alan Goodrum, Robin Herzberg and Stuart Kenny. It was dissolved in 1995.
