= Rodney Parade =

Stadium in Newport, Wales, United Kingdom

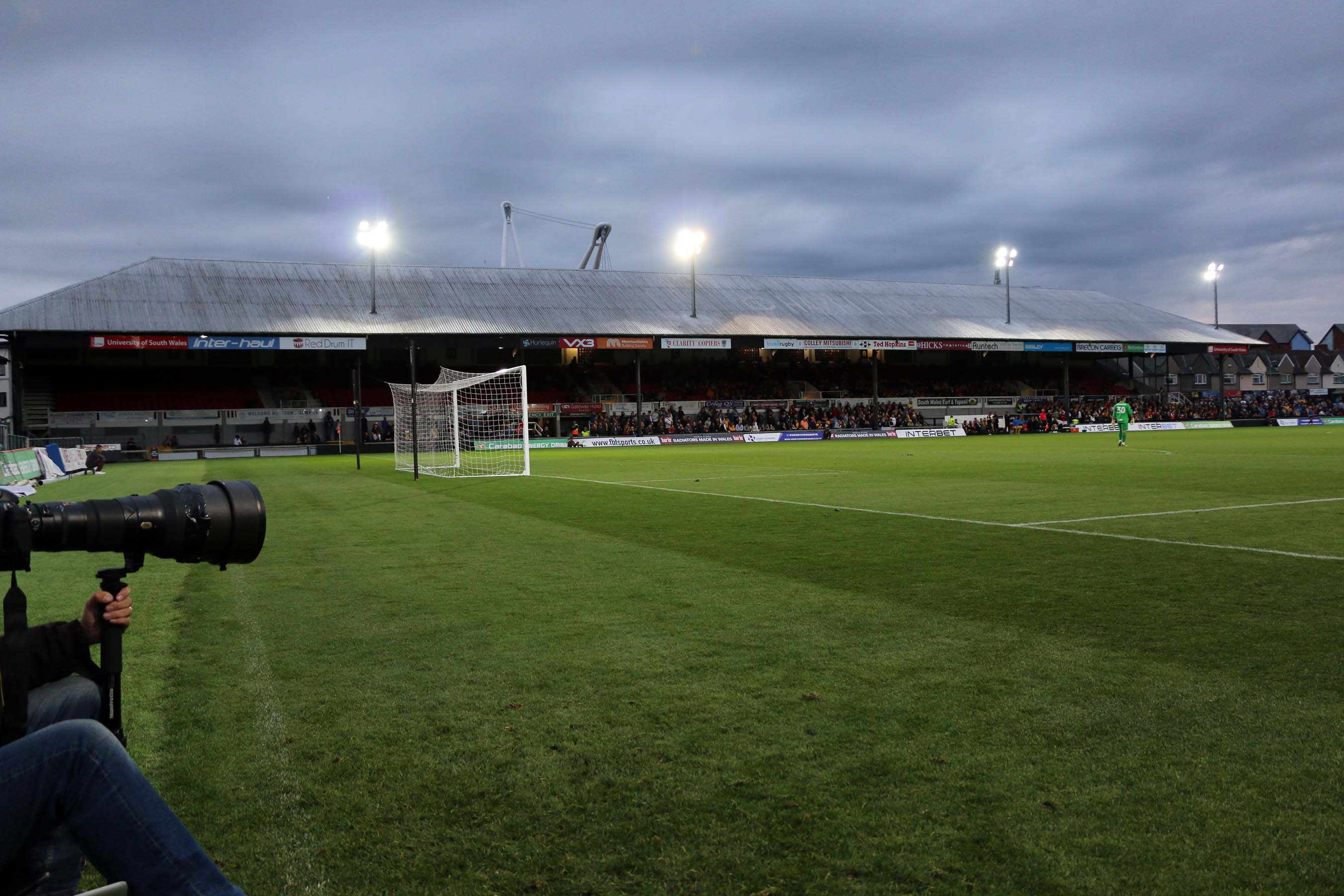
- Rodney Parade West Stand

- Location within Newport
- Location: Rodney Road; Newport; NP19 0UU
- Coordinates: 51°35′18″N 2°59′16″W
- Owner: Dragons Stadium
- Operator: Dragons RFC
- Capacity: 8,700 (7,850 for football)
- Surface: PlayMaster (Hybrid grass)
- Record attendance: 31,000 (Newport RFC vs South Africa, January 10 1952) Limited
- Public transit: Newport railway station Newport bus station

Construction
- Opened: 1877
- Architect: Thomas Douglas-Jones

Tenants
- Dragons RFC (2003-present); Newport County A.F.C. (2012-present)

Rodney Parade is a stadium in the city of Newport, South Wales. It is located on the east bank of the River Usk in Newport city centre. The ground is on Rodney Road, a short walk from the city's central bus and railway stations via Newport Bridge or Newport City footbridge. There is no spectator car park at the ground but a number of multi-storey car parks are nearby.

Rodney Parade is the home ground of Dragons RFC, one of the four Welsh regional rugby union teams. It is also the home ground of Newport County football club. It is the third-oldest sports venue in the Football League, after the Racecourse Ground and Deepdale. Stadium capacity is reduced from rugby levels for football matches.

In 2017 the rugby union club Newport RFC sold Rodney Parade to the Welsh Rugby Union and subsequently in 2021 Newport RFC relocated to Newport Stadium. In 2023 a private consortium purchased Rodney Parade and the Dragons regional rugby union team from the WRU.

Newport Squash Rackets Club has four squash courts at Rodney Parade.

== Layout ==
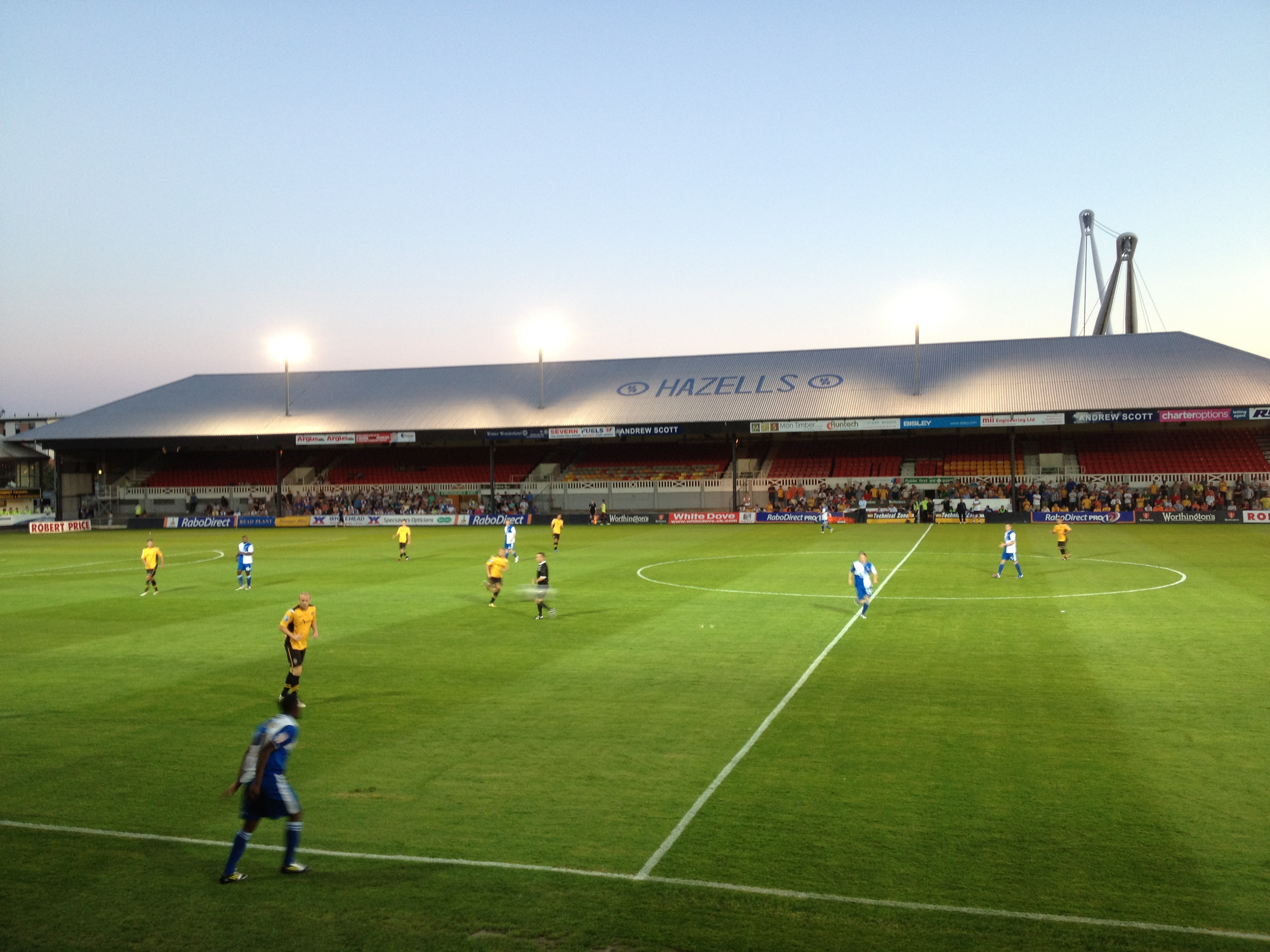
Rodney Parade West Stand

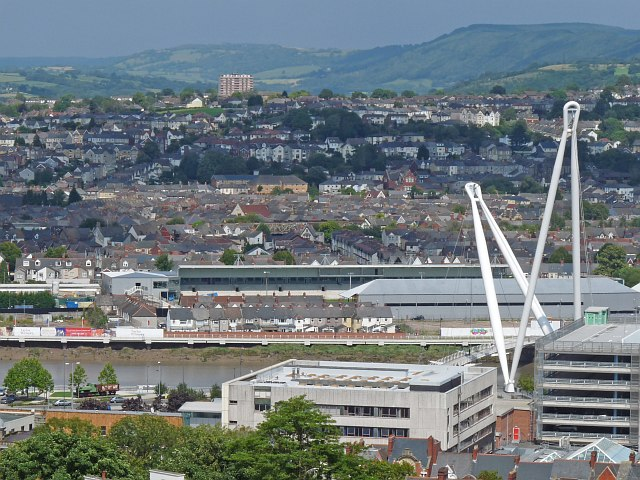
Rodney Parade viewed looking eastwards from Newport Cathedral across the River Usk

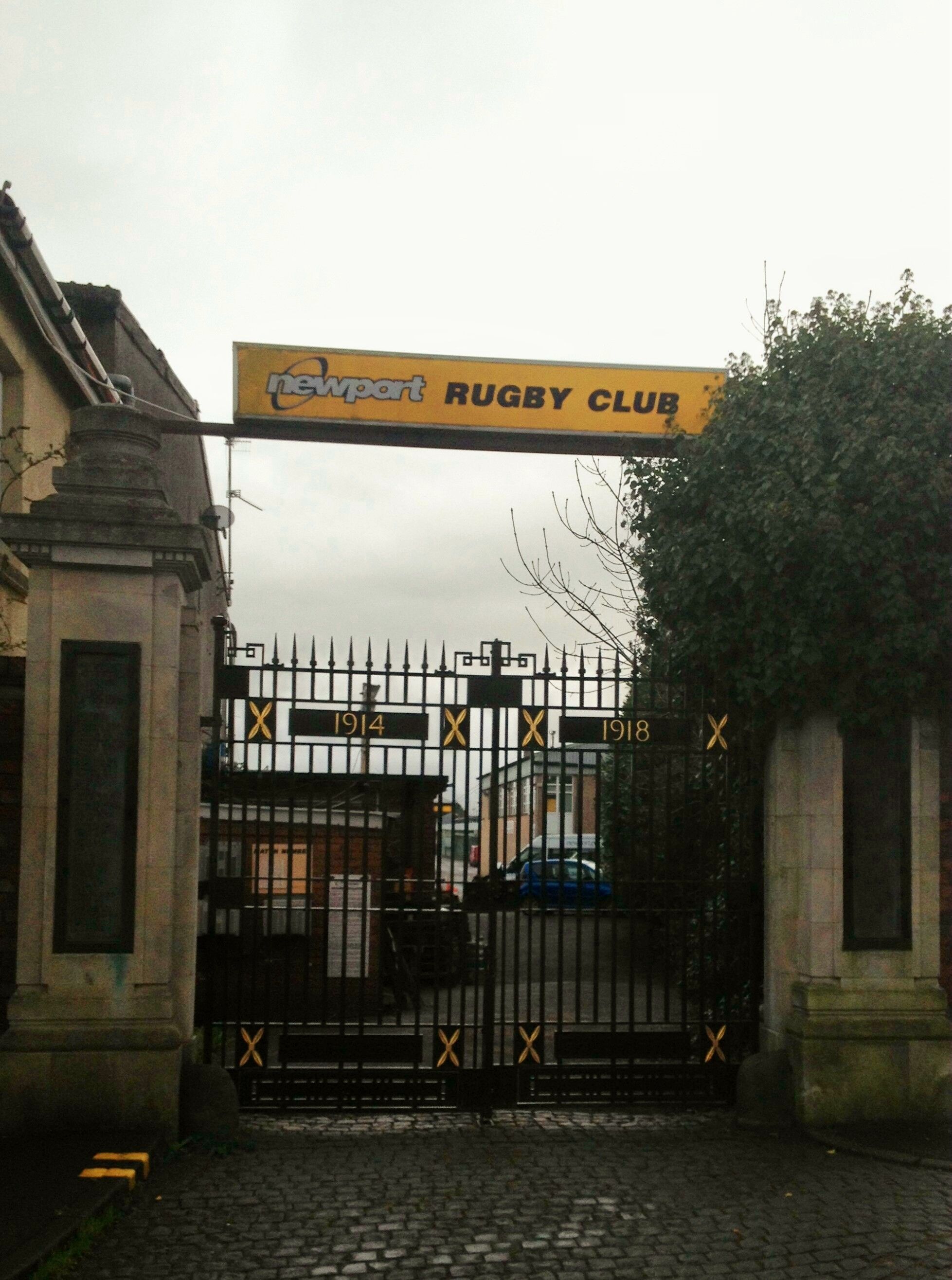
Rodney Parade memorial gates

Rodney Parade has two covered stands: the two-tier Candleston Stand (west) and the Bisley Stand (east) which are along the touchlines of the pitch. The upper tier of the west stand is seated with 1,996 seats, including 40 Press seats and the lower tier is a standing terrace. The east stand is all-seated with a 2,526 capacity including 144 seats in 13 hospitality boxes, food/drink outlets and a gantry for television cameras. The TV cameras are therefore pointing westward and often show the sun setting over Newport city centre.

The North Terrace is uncovered standing and adjoins a small uncovered standing terrace on the west touchline alongside the west stand. The South End of the stadium houses players' changing rooms, a media centre, large video screen and the small uncovered stand with 222 seats for away football fans. Away football fans are also sited in block F of the east stand giving a total capacity of 1,300 for away football fans. Capacity has occasionally been increased for major FA Cup matches with the addition of temporary stands at the north and south ends.

The hospitality suite is located in the North End of the East Stand on the upper level.

The rugby ticket office and club shop is located at the north end of the East Stand accessed via the main gate to the ground (Gate 4) off Grafton Road. The Newport County ticket office is a separate building just inside Gate 4.

To the north of the North Terrace is a tented fanzone for pre and post match entertainment and a floodlit grass training area. Further north, parallel to Grafton Road, is the rugby clubhouse/office facilities including Rodney Hall.

== History ==
=== 1877 Establishment ===
In 1875, the Newport Athletic Club was created, and two years later they secured the use of land at Rodney Parade from Godfrey Morgan, 1st Viscount Tredegar, for their cricket, tennis, rugby union and athletics teams. In October 1879, Newport RFC played Cardiff RFC in a floodlit game at Rodney Parade. It was the first ground in Wales to have floodlights installed.

Newport RFC enjoyed six highly successful seasons, being unbeaten during that time. The team sustained their first defeat in the 1870s, but were again unbeaten in seasons 1891-2 and 1922-3.

Monmouthshire County Cricket Club played at Rodney Parade from 1901 to 1934.

Rodney Parade hosted Wales international matches against England, France and Scotland. Touring international teams the 1924 New Zealand All Blacks and the 1960 South Africa Springboks both narrowly defeated Newport RFC at Rodney Parade.

=== 1993 School development ===
The cricket ground, which was on the south side of the stadium, was demolished and the new Maindee primary school was built on the site in 1993. Newport Cricket Club relocated to the Newport International Sports Village.

=== 2003 Regional rugby and ground redevelopment ===
Following the introduction of regional rugby union teams in Wales, the Newport Gwent Dragons regional team was formed on 1 April 2003 and shared Rodney Parade with Newport RFC.

On 4 September 2007, it was announced that the Rodney Parade site was due to be redeveloped into a 15,000-capacity stadium by the beginning of the 2010–11 rugby union season. The redevelopment was backed by Newport City Council, Newport Unlimited, Newport RFC and Newport Gwent Dragons. The application received planning consent on 11 March 2009. The plan included construction of covered stands at the north and south ends and the provision of cover on the stretch of the west touchline terrace. In August 2010, it was announced that the target finish date for the first phase had been put back to the beginning of the 2011–12 rugby union season with the full redevelopment planned to take several years. The new east stand was opened in October 2011, and named the Bisley Stand for sponsorship purposes.

=== 2012 Newport County relocation ===
In May 2012, it was agreed that Newport County football club would move from Newport Stadium and play its home fixtures at Rodney Parade as part of an initial three-year deal, meaning that the stadium would host association football matches on a regular basis for the first time. In February 2013, Newport County agreed a further 10-year lease to play at Rodney Parade.

In April 2013, Newport Athletic Bowls Club relocated from Rodney Parade to Caerleon.

In the summers of 2013 and 2014, new drainage and irrigation systems were installed under the grass playing surface. Despite that, serious drainage problems occurred at the end of 2016. Newport County's matches against Barnet on 3 September and Morecambe on 10 December were abandoned at half-time because the pitch was waterlogged and the English Football League stepped in to help identify the problem.

=== 2017 Welsh Rugby Union ownership ===
In March 2017, the sale of the ground to the Welsh Rugby Union was agreed following a vote of Newport RFC shareholders. The takeover was completed on 27 June 2017 and work started to install a hybrid grass pitch for the 2017–18 rugby and football season.

In 2018 the record attendance for a Newport County match at Rodney Parade was set at 9,836 against Tottenham Hotspur in the FA cup fourth round.

In August 2020 the memorial gates, on the corner of Rodney and Grafton Roads, were given Grade II listed building status. They were erected in 1923–24 to commemorate members of Newport Athletic Club who were killed in the First World War. The gates are made of steel and the gate piers of Portland stone. Each pier is faced with a bronze panel inscribed with the names of the dead.

In March 2021 Newport County were permitted by the EFL to move two home matches to Cardiff City Stadium due to the poor condition of the Rodney Parade pitch. The Dragons also switched three home matches to the Millennium Stadium, Cardiff. Scheduled pitch maintenance had been cancelled in Summer 2020 by the ground owners WRU due to the COVID-19 pandemic in the United Kingdom. The pitch and drainage redevelopment including a hybrid grass surface was completed in August 2021.

In October 2021 Newport RFC relocated their home matches from Rodney Parade to Newport Stadium whilst agreeing with the WRU to play two matches per season at Rodney Parade. In May 2022 Rodney Parade ground staff were presented with the Best Pitch in EFL League Two award for the 2021–22 football season and the 2022–23 football season.

=== 2023 Private ownership ===
In June 2023 a consortium headed by former Just Eat CEO and current Dragons chairman David Buttress bought the Rodney Parade site and the Dragons rugby union team from the Welsh Rugby Union.

In July 2023 Newport County football club agreed a new short term lease to continue to play their matches at the ground. In July 2024 Newport County football club agreed a new 10 year lease to play their home matches at Rodney Parade

== International matches ==
Rodney Parade has hosted six full-cap rugby union international matches for the Wales national rugby union team:

Date	Part of	Opponent	Final score
12 January 1884	1884 Home Nations Championship	Scotland	0G, 0T – 1G, 1T
4 February 1888	1888 Home Nations Championship	Scotland	0G, 1T – 0G, 0T
3 January 1891	1891 Home Nations Championship	England	3–7
3 February 1894	1894 Home Nations Championship	Scotland	7–0
9 January 1897	1897 Home Nations Championship	England	11–0
25 March 1912	Friendly	France	14–8

It has hosted one match for the Wales women's national football team:

Date	Part of	Opponent	Final score
31 August 2018	Women's World Cup Qualifier	England	0–3

== See also ==
- List of rugby league stadiums by capacity
- List of rugby union stadiums by capacity
