= PLACE Built Environment Centre =

Coordinates: 54.6012°N 5.9307°W

- Established: 2004
- Dissolved: 31 August 2019
- Location: 7–9 Lower Garfield Street, Belfast, BT1 1FP
- Type: Architecture centre
- Website: placeni.org

PLACE Built Environment Centre (shortened to PLACE) was a non-profit architecture organisation located in Belfast, Northern Ireland from 2004 to 2019. It ran a public programme of events and exhibitions in Belfast, Derry and other towns and cities in Northern Ireland. It ran education projects in schools and community participation projects in local neighbourhoods. The vision statement of PLACE was "a better place to live, work and play, inspired by communities making a difference." PLACE is an acronym for Planning, Landscape, Architecture, Community and Environment.

== Activities ==
=== Public programme ===
PLACE ran a public programme of exhibitions, debates and discussions, architecture tours, site visits and design workshops on various local and international built environment topics relevant to Northern Ireland. Some exhibitions were produced in-house or commissioned by PLACE, while others were travelling exhibitions produced by external curators and organisations. PLACE events were occasionally hosted by other venues in Belfast (such as the Ulster Hall) and in other towns and cities in Northern Ireland.

=== Projects ===
PLACE also ran architecture and urban design education and community projects in areas across Northern Ireland and produced publications on built environment topics relevant to Northern Ireland.

== History ==
PLACE was established in 2004 by the Royal Society of Ulster Architects and Belfast City Council, with support from the Arts Council of Northern Ireland under its Architecture and Built Environment Policy. From 2004 until 2011, PLACE was a part of the Royal Society of Ulster Architects. It was established as an independent private limited company in April 2011.

== Structure and funding ==
The organisation was governed by a voluntary management board. The chairman of PLACE was Iain Davidson. PLACE had five staff members, an occasional voluntary team and a voluntary internship scheme for eight to ten interns per year (typically lasting three months each). The primary funding for PLACE came from the Arts Council of Northern Ireland, Department of Culture, Arts and Leisure, Department for Social Development, Department of the Environment and Department of Finance and Personnel.

In April 2019, the Arts Council of Northern Ireland announced it was withdrawing its financial support for PLACE. The management board of PLACE unsuccessful appealed the decision before making a case to the office of the Northern Ireland Ombudsman for review. The Arts Council of Northern Ireland made a conditional and limited offer of funding to PLACE but the management board declined the offer. PLACE closed on 31 August 2019.
