= Shepherd Building Group =

Portable building business in York, England

Shepherd Building Group Ltd
- Type: Private company
- Industry: Construction
- Founded: 1890; 136 years ago in York
- Founder: Frederick Shepherd
- Headquarters: York
- Area served: United Kingdom; Europe
- Key people: Dan Ibbetson (CEO)
- Products: Prefabricated buildings; Relocatable buildings; Modular buildings; Portable buildings; Portable toilets; Investment property
- Revenue: ▲£345.0 million (2020); £334.3 million (2019)
- Net income: ▲£64.1 million (2020); £34.7 million (2019)
- Owner: Shepherd Family
- Number of employees: ▼1,876 (2020); 1,932 (2019)
- Website: www.shepherd-group.com

Shepherd Building Group Ltd is a family owned business, based in York, that manufactures, leases and sells modular buildings in the UK and Europe. Its brands have included Portaloo and Portakabin, though the latter was sold in June 2024.

The company was one of the largest privately owned building contractors in the UK, but sold that business to Wates Group in 2015.

== History ==
In 1890, 35 year old joiner Frederick Shepherd started the business in York. His younger son Frederick Welton Shepherd joined and expanded the firm known, from 1910, as F Shepherd and Son. They diversified from house building to general contracting, and incorporated, in 1924, as F Shepherd and Son Ltd. By the late 1930s there was a workforce of 700 that operated throughout Yorkshire, and also the North East of England.

=== Main contractor ===
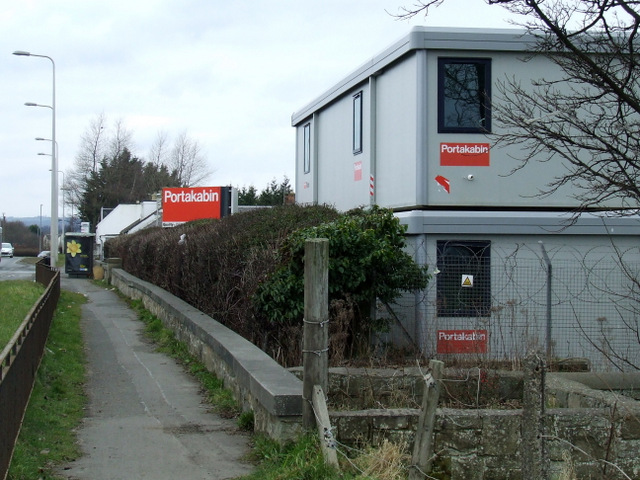

The firm undertook extensive work at military sites up to, and during, the Second World War. Post conflict contracts were predominantly public sector, often incorporating prefabricated concrete panel systems developed by CLASP, Wates, and Yorkshire Development Group.

In 1962, F Shepherd and Son Ltd reorganised under Shepherd Group Ltd, and land was purchased at Huntington. Initially it was used for manufacturing, but in 1995 the headquarters moved there from Blue Bridge Lane, near the River Ouse. The old headquarters site became a Mecca Bingo hall before that too was demolished to make way for the construction of Frederick House student accommodation in 2022.

By 1968, the group employed 6,788 staff. That fell to 3,587 in 1971, and by 2009 there were 3,200.

Shepherd Group was a main contractor for leisure, commercial, industrial, residential, healthcare, education, retail, and research buildings. The construction division also included companies engaged in mechanical and electrical services, facility management and housebuilding.

=== Manufactured products ===
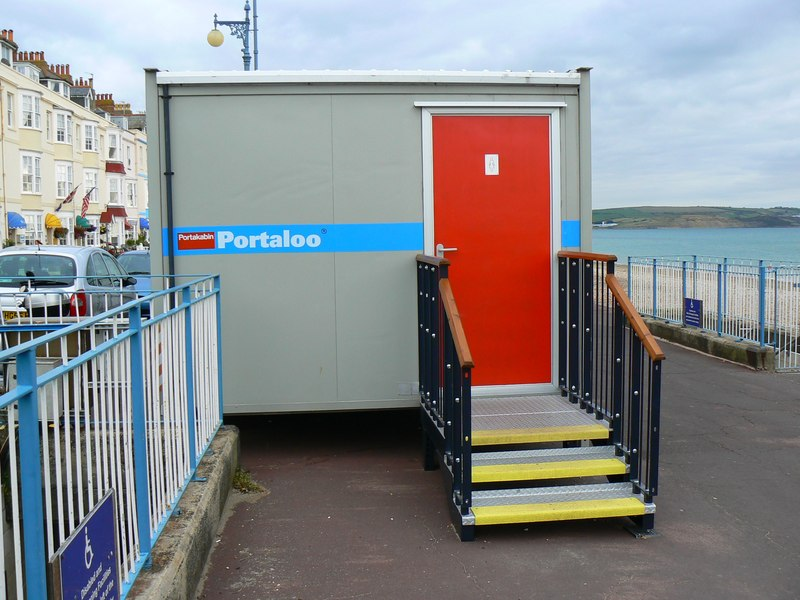

In 1951 Donald Shepherd, grandson of the founder, developed a bulk cement silo, for use in precast concrete construction, as an alternative to paper sacks. They were sold to other contractors, initially manufactured from plywood. He changed the construction to metal in 1953, and diverted joinery shop capacity released to the production of portable, prefabricated site huts. He conceived the need for easily portable site shelters on a windswept construction site at Catterick Garrison. Initially the huts were for the firm's own sites, but from 1961 they were sold to other contractors. He called the silos and cabins Portasilo and Portakabin.

Donald Shepherd continued product development in 1966 with the Portablu portable toilet, soon rebranded Portaloo.

By 1967 the prefabricated buildings were being used outside of construction, as offices, classrooms, and even operating theatres.

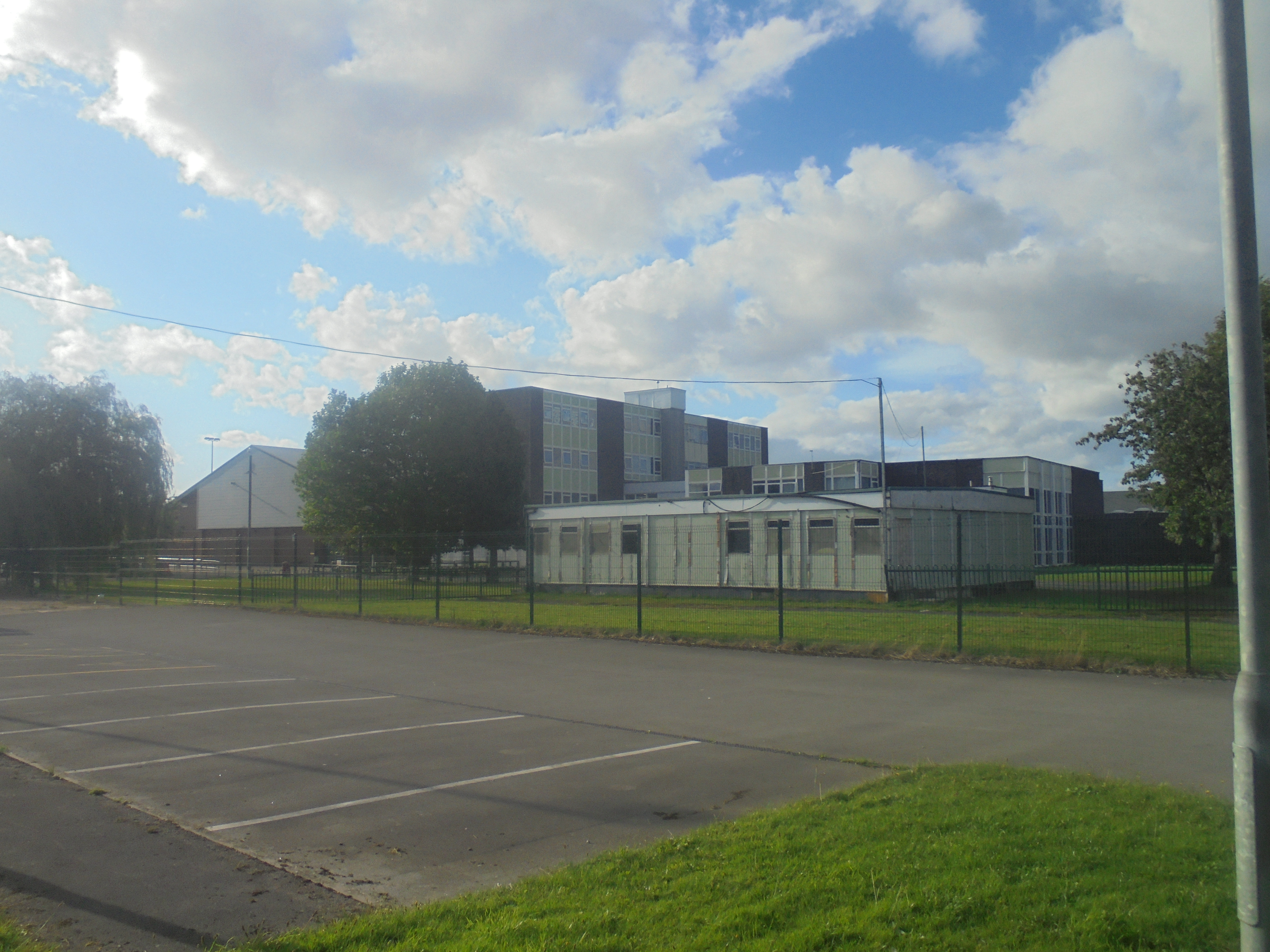
Portakabin classroom, Wetherby, 2019

Shepherd Group introduced prefabricated, relocatable buildings under the Yorkon brand in 1980. By 1987 they outsold the portable cabins. A heavily insulated Pullman variant earned subsidiary Portakabin Ltd a Queens Award for Technological Achievement in 1992.

By 2009 there were two semi-autonomous, manufactured product divisions of Shepherd Group, distinct from the original contracting, and building service division:

- Portakabin, Allspace, Yorkon, Foremans, Konstructa and Portaloo brands of modular buildings and toilets.
- Portasilo and Portastor, silo and modular products.

They were supported by 75 hire centres. The cabins could be found as far afield as Antarctica and Libya.

=== Disposal of non core businesses ===
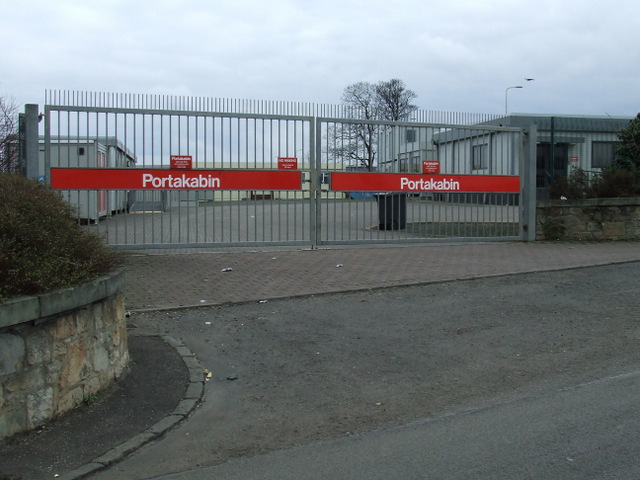

The Portakabin division was consistently profitable. By 2015 the others were not, and directors chose to sell or close them.

In January 2015, 80 redundancies were announced at Shepherd Group's silo and modular products division. It was closed in 2019, and the Portasilo and Portastor products discontinued.

In May 2015, Galliford Try's Linden Homes subsidiary purchased Shepherd Homes, affecting 60 employees.

Later in 2015, Wates Group purchased Shepherd Group's mechanical and electrical services and facilities management businesses, and some of the Shepherd Construction contracts, for £9.8 million. It did not acquire Shepherd's loss making Colindale mixed use development, or take over liability for past contracts. Twelve hundred Shepherd Construction staff transferred to Wates Group.

Shepherd Group accounts for 2020 show ongoing costs of £29.3 million in that year, and £19.7 million in the prior, arising from Colindale and other legacy construction contracts. Liabilities for past projects continued to affect Shepherd Building Group in April 2026. Its accounts for the 18 months to 30 June 2025 showed SBG made provisions of £18.6m relating to "historic construction contracts undertaken by the company’s subsidiary companies".

=== Sale of Portakabin ===
In June 2024, Shepherd Group sold Portakabin to France's Antin Infrastructure Partners for over £1.5bn.

== Buildings ==
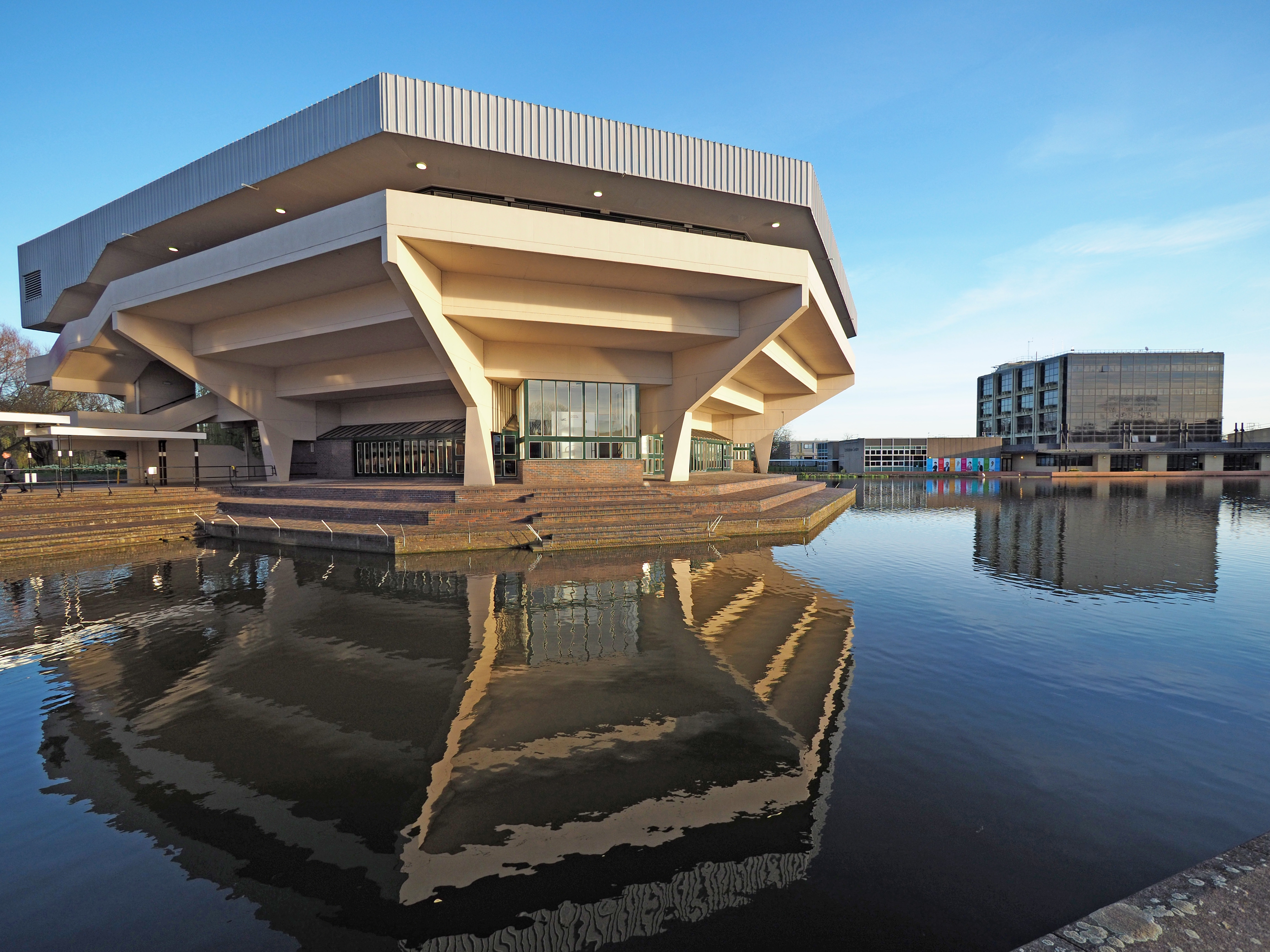
Central Hall, University of York

Shepherd Construction was main contractor for buildings including:

- Foxwood School, 1956
- HM Prison Everthorpe, 1956
- University of York, 1963
- Trevelyan College, Durham, 1967
- Hunslet Grange Flats, 1968
- York Minster (foundations), 1972
- Leeds railway station (expansion), 1973
- National Railway Museum, 1973
- Wolfson College, Oxford, 1977
- HM Prison Frankland, 1981
- The Ridings Centre, 1983
- Potteries Shopping Centre, 1989
- HM Prison Doncaster, 1994
- St Paul's bus station, 2000
- Bishop Auckland Hospital, 2002
- Liverpool Civil and Family Court, 2006
- Sky Plaza, 2009
- Trinity Walk, 2011
- Hitachi Newton Aycliffe, 2015

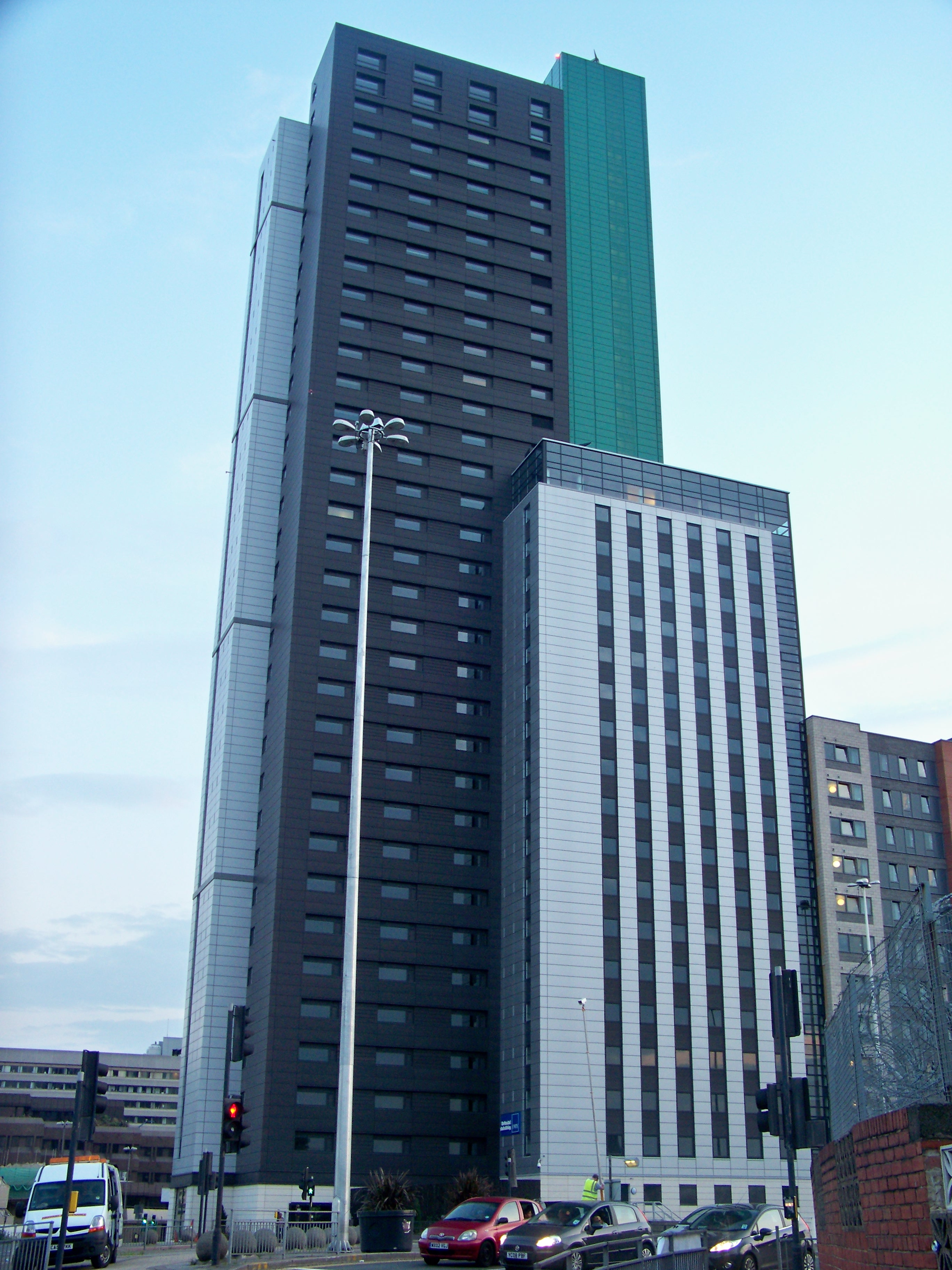
Sky Plaza

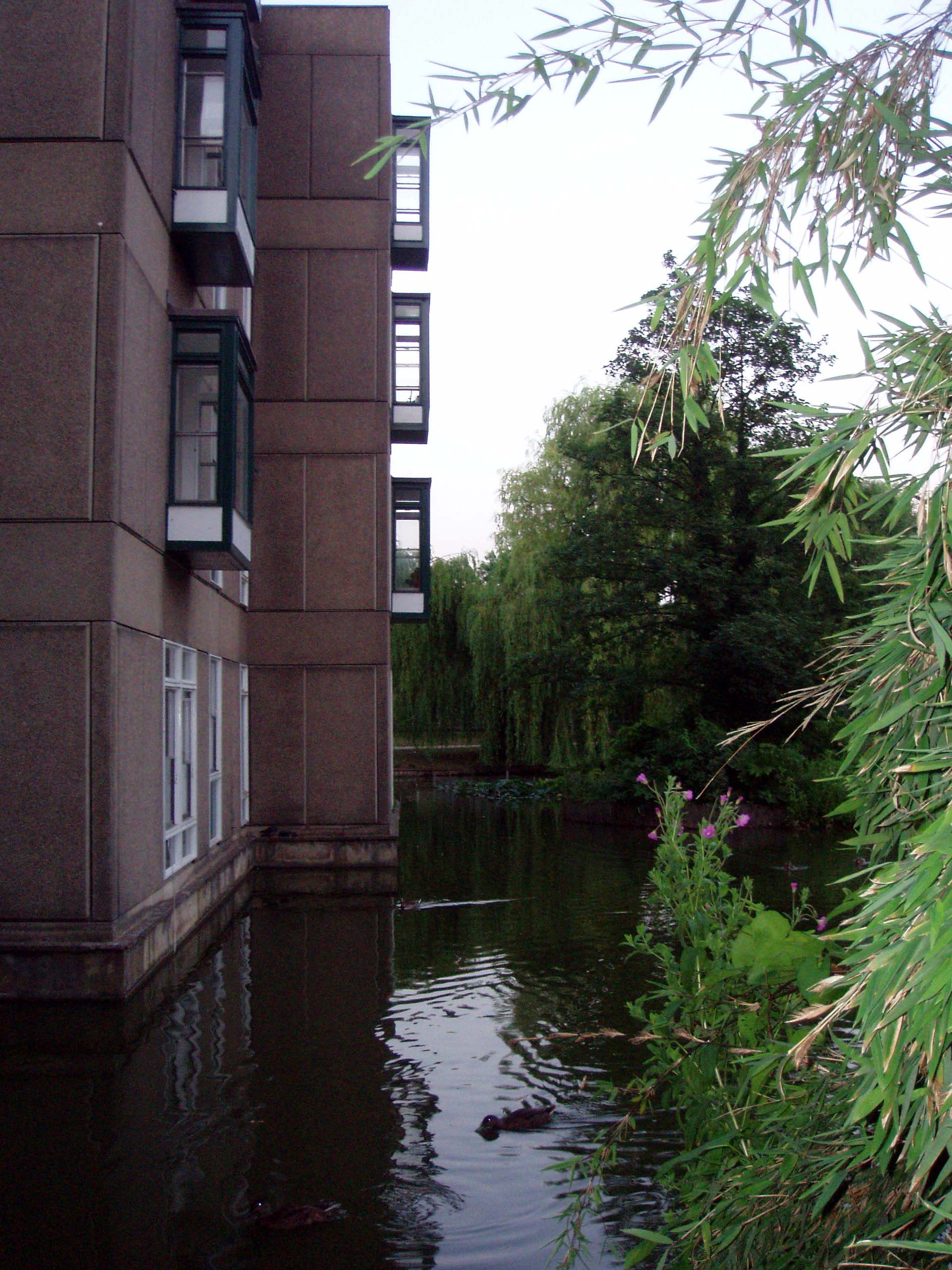
Derwent College, University of York CLASP construction

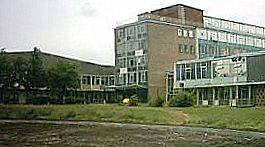
Foxwood School

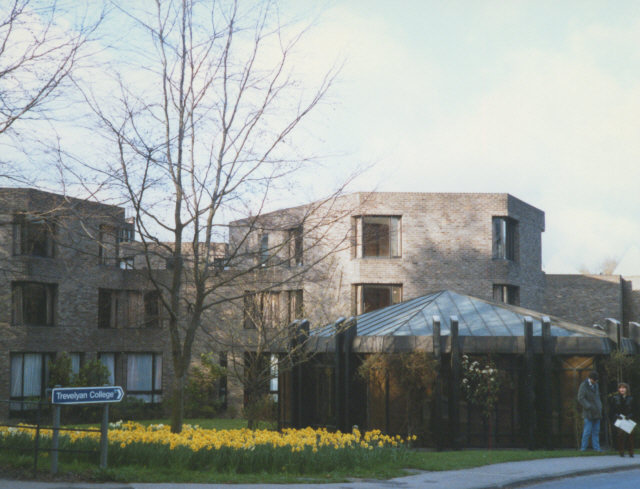
Trevelyan College

== Controversies ==
=== Anonymous emails ===
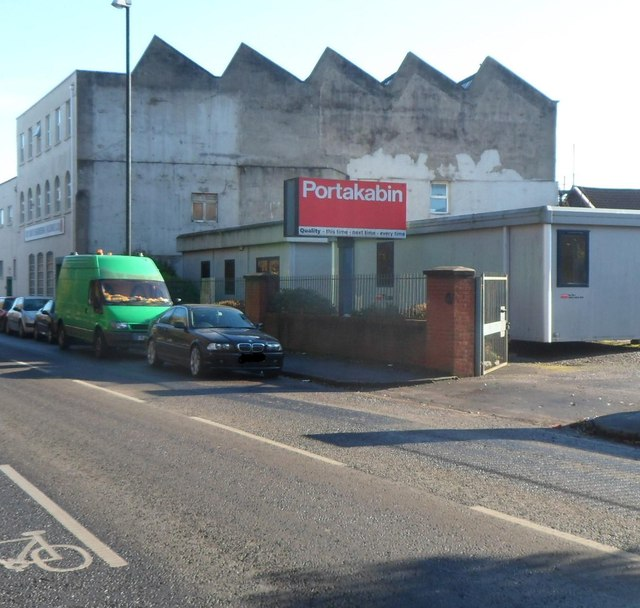

In July 2021, Shepherd Group subsidiaries asked the High Court of Ireland for a Norwich Pharmacal order to require Google to disclose any identity information it held relating to a gmail address. The address had been used to suggest Portakabin products did not comply with Irish building standards; were of poor quality, and that named managers were incompetent and dishonest. The claims were derogatory, damaging and untrue. The Court ordered Google to provide Shepherd Group with the requested information.

=== Hand tool vibration ===
In August 2017, Shepherd Group was served a Health and Safety Executive Improvement Notice because of hand tools causing excessive hand arm vibration at their York site. It complied with the Notice by February 2018.

=== Domain names ===
In June 2016, Shepherd Group recovered registration of domain name portalooservices.co.uk from Nominet. It had been abusively registered by a third party.

In September 2017, Shepherd Group recovered registration of domain name portaloohirebirmingham.co.uk from Nominet. It had been abusively registered by a third party.

=== Employment blacklist ===
Shepherd Construction Group subsidiary Shepherd Engineering Services subscribed to the Consulting Association's illegal employment blacklist. In 2009, it was one of 14 firms issued with enforcement notices by the Information Commissioner's Office.

=== Trinity Walk ===
In 2008 Shepherd contracted with William Hare Group to provide structural steelwork for Brendan Flood's Trinity Walk shopping centre development in Wakefield. Shepherd subsequently sought, under a pay when paid clause, to withhold payment in the sum of £996,683.35 because the ultimate client had gone into administration. In 2009 Mr Justice Coulson of the Technology and Construction Court ruled against the payment being withheld. That judgement was upheld at the Court of Appeal in 2010. Shepherd had used an obsolete form of words in their contract with William Hare.

Shepherd went on to purchase the part built shopping centre, with AREA Property Partners, in order to complete it.

== See also ==
- F. Pratten and Co Ltd
