= Trinity Walk =

Coordinates: 53.685°N 1.495°W

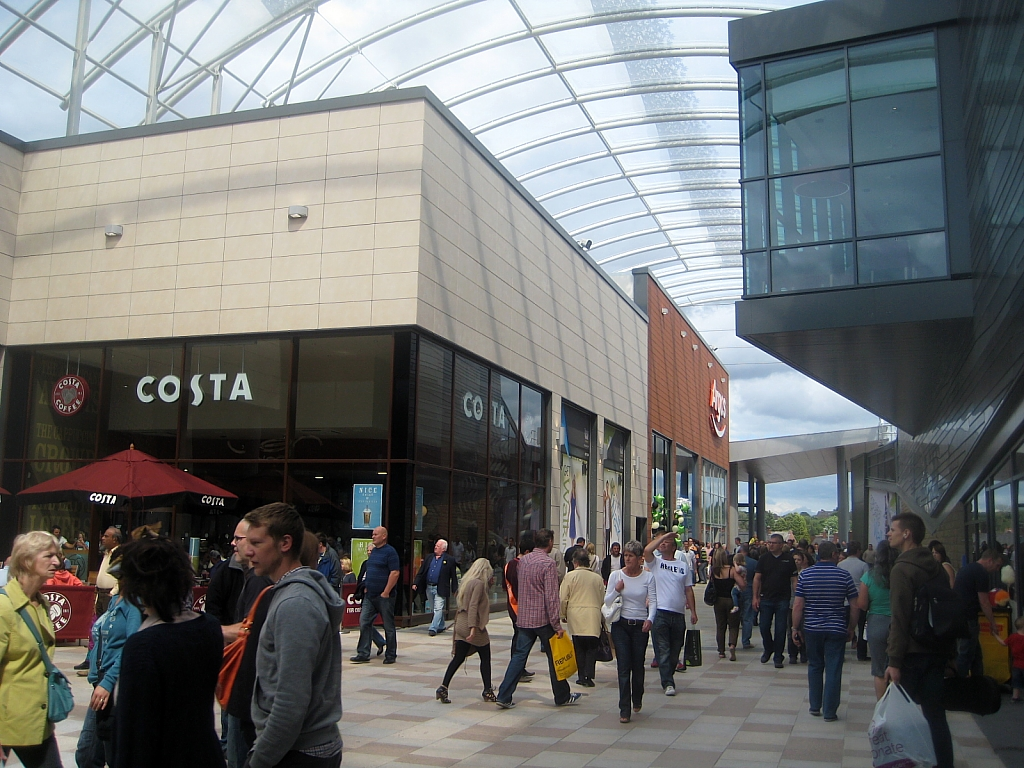
- Location: Wakefield, England
- Opened: 6 May 2011
- Developer: Shepherd Building Group
- Owner: Sovereign Land / AREA Property Partners
- Num. of stores: 70+ (includes 4 reserved for catering)
- Num. of anchor tenants: 4
- Floor area: 560,000 sq ft (55,000 m^{2})
- Floors: 1
- Parking: 1,000 spaces
- Website: www.trinitywalk.com

Trinity Walk is a shopping centre in Wakefield, West Yorkshire. England. Opened on 6 May 2011, Wakefield Council describe it as "[Wakefield's] most important City Centre development for more than 20 years".

== Retail scheme ==
Trinity Walk is 560,000 sq ft partially enclosed shopping centre with over 70 stores and 1,000 car parking spaces, with access from Wakefield’s inner city ring road (A61) and the main bus station. The centre contains major stores, including an 8,500 m^{2} Sainsbury's and retailers Sports Direct, Søstrene Grene, Next, New Look, and Pandora.

The centre recorded its record year for footfall in 2024 with around 11.35 million visits.

== History ==
On 19 March 2009, it appeared that the development was going to fall victim to the 2008 financial crisis when KPMG were called in as administrators as the Anglo Irish Bank withdrew its support for the project. Building work stopped and the steel structure stood half finished.

Brendan Flood's scheme was rescued in early 2010 by a consortium who bought the development from administrators – a joint venture company comprising Sovereign Land, AREA Property Partners, and Shepherd Building Group.

Trinity Walk opened on Friday 6 May 2011.

== Wakefield regeneration ==
Trinity Walk has created hundreds of new jobs in the city.

== See also ==
- The Ridings Centre
