= Carrington Power Station =

Power station in Greater Manchester, England

- Country: England
- Location: Greater Manchester, North West England
- Coordinates: 53.435771°N 2.410892°W
- Status: Operational
- Construction began: 2009
- Commission date: 1956 (coal); 2016 (gas)
- Decommission date: 1991 (coal)
- Operators: Central Electricity Authority (1956–1957); Central Electricity Generating Board (1957–1990); PowerGen (1990–1991)

Thermal power station
- Primary fuel: Natural gas
- Combined cycle?: Yes

Power generation
- Units operational: 2 (combined cycle gas)
- Units planned: 4 × 60 MW
- Units decommissioned: 4 (coal)
- Nameplate capacity: 884 MW; 884 MW

Carrington Power Station is a combined cycle gas turbine power station, which was completed in Autumn 2016 and began commercial operation on 18 September 2016. It is located on the site of a former coal-fired power station, close to the villages of Carrington and Partington in the Greater Manchester Area and 12 km (7.5 mi) southwest of Manchester City Centre. The Manchester Ship Canal and the River Mersey run alongside the site, in Trafford, Greater Manchester, in North West England.

== History - coal-fired power station ==
=== Background ===
The station's site, on the south-east bank of the point where the River Mersey runs into the Manchester Ship Canal, was acquired by Manchester Corporation in 1916 as an alternative site for Barton Power Station, but was never developed. The construction of a coal-fired power station on the site did not occur until after the Second World War. The Manchester Corporation Electricity Department began planning the station in 1947. Planning was continued by the British Electricity Authority, following the nationalisation of the industry in 1948. It was initially planned for the site to comprise two stations; an A station and a B station. Each station was to have a capacity of 240 megawatts (MW), a total capacity of 480 MW over the site, but only the A station was built.

=== Construction, design and specification ===
Because the station's site was surrounded by water on two sides, its strata were variable and so all of the buildings' foundations were piled. Approximately 7,850 piles were made, all of reinforced concrete construction, with an average length of 30 feet (9.1 m) and with a load of 50 tonnes per pile. The station's main buildings consisted of a turbine hall, boiler house and a pair of chimneys. Other structures included workshops, storage areas, a canteen and office block buildings. The approximate dimensions of the main buildings measured 480 feet (150 m) by 275 feet (84 m). 10,300 tonnes of steel was used in the main buildings' steel frame, erection of which began in November 1949, and the construction of the superstructure beginning in December 1950. The steel frame was clad with brick, while copings and cills were made from artificial stone. The station had granolithic flooring, but the turbine hall and boiler room floors were tiled. The roofs were made from reinforced concrete with glass glazing. Two elevators were provided, to give access to all floors. The station's two chimneys were each 350 feet (110 m) high and of brick construction. Ten million bricks were used in the construction of the station.

Commissioning of the station's first generating set took place in 1953. All of the station's generating sets were commissioned by 1956. The station was officially opened by Sir William Walker on 20 July 1956. By then, the British Electricity Authority had become the Central Electricity Authority. This in turn became the Central Electricity Generating Board in 1957.

=== Operation ===
The station generated electricity using four 60 megawatt (MW) Metropolitan-Vickers turbo-alternators, giving the station a total generating capacity of 240 MW. Steam for the generators was provided by seven boilers. Boilers no. 1 to 4 were produced by Babcock & Wilcox, and boilers no. 5 to 7 by John Brown Land Boilers. The latter were the first made by this company to be commissioned by the Central Electricity Authority. The boilers had a rated output of 45 kg/s; steam conditions were 62.06 bar and 482 °C.

Initially the station operated at base load, and maintained a good load factor into the middle of its life.

The generating capacity and electricity output from Carrington power station is given in the following table.

Carrington generating capacity and output
| Year | 1954 | 1955 | 1956 | 1957 | 1958 | 1961 | 1962 | 1963 | 1967 | 1972 | 1979 | 1982 | 1989 |
|---|---|---|---|---|---|---|---|---|---|---|---|---|---|
| Installed capacity, MW | 56 | 112 | 168 | 244 | 240 | 256 | 256 | 256 | 240 | 256 | 256 | 256 | 240 |
| Electricity output, GWh | 118.191 | 687.620 | 816.664 | 1048.611 | 1699.250 | 1242.6 | 1227.1 | 1528.8 | 1743.4 | 1063.129 | 879.846 | 712.120 | ? |

Electricity output, GWh

Between 1984 and 1985 the station broke its own output records. In the final years of its operating life it retained a high availability, to meet the peaks of winter evening electricity demands. After the United Kingdom's electric supply industry was privatised in 1990, the station was operated by PowerGen. It continued generating electricity until it was closed in 1991, and was demolished several years later.

== Current gas-fired power station ==
=== Background ===
A gas-fired combined cycle gas turbine power station has now been built, utilising the same site as the original coal-fired station. Bridestone Developments constructed the £500 million station, which is capable of generating 884MW of electricity (at approximately 58% efficiency); enough power to supply a million homes. Irish utility company ESB Group purchased an 85% stake in the project from Carlton Power in September 2008. The station is also a combined heat and power plant, capable of providing nearby businesses with steam, if they require a supply. Bridestone were granted planning permission to build the station by the Department of Business, Enterprise and Regulatory Reform in July 2008. This meant the plans were not subject to approval from Trafford Council. Its construction began in late 2009, providing 900 construction jobs. Fifty permanent jobs are provided by the current power station.

=== Construction, design and specification ===
Barge transport was used where possible for all heavy loads, such as the gas turbines. Shipments from global locations such as China, Indonesia, Germany, Poland and Spain navigated to Ellesmere port in Cheshire and eventually along the Manchester Ship Canal to the Carrington site. The 40 km (25 mi) trip from Ellesmere to Carrington was undertaken a total of 20 times. Across the 800 kilometres of waterways travelled, approx. 8,000 tonnes of equipment was transported. ESB claimed that this was 50% more efficient than road transport and that 200 tonnes of carbon dioxide emissions were prevented as a result. Given the large workforce at the project, a ‘green travel plan’ was also implemented where workers were transported to and from the site via double-decker buses from satellite car parks. These measures reduced the impact of traffic on local residents. Due to the sustainable approaches adopted during construction of the station, the project was shortlisted for a UK corporate responsibility award in 2014.

The station is a combined-cycle power plant (CCPP), using natural gas to generate 884MW of electricity. The CCPP uses both a gas and a steam turbine together, to produce up to 50 per cent more electricity from the same fuel than a traditional simple-cycle plant. The waste heat from the gas turbine is routed to the nearby steam turbine, which generates additional power. Carrington consists of two CCPP KA26-1 units. At operating design conditions, each CCPP unit generates 442.3 MW net output. The station generates enough power to meet the electricity needs of one million homes in the UK and began commercial operation on 18 September 2016.

In 2013, Severfield plc contracted with the Duro Felguera group to provide steelwork for the new Carrington Power Station. Duro Felguera's UK subsidiary refused to pay a December 2014 stage payment. Severfield obtained adjudication under the Housing Grants, Construction and Regeneration Act 1996 for £2,470,231.97, and then sought summary judgment from the High Court of Justice to enforce payment for a reduced amount of £1,445,495.78. Judge Smith refused because part of the sum related to a power plant and was therefore excluded from the 1996 act, and the adjudicator's jurisdiction. Duro Felguera argued it was in fact owed money by Severfield because of overpayments.

Severfield finally obtained a judgment in 2017 for £2,774,077.91 (or £1,760,480.27 up to 2014) but by then Duro Felguera UK Ltd had entered liquidation and recovery was limited to what Duro Felguera in Spain could be obliged to pay under a parent company guarantee for the period up to 2014.

=== Power train ===
Each power train includes an Alstom GT26 gas turbine, a horizontal triple-pressure Heat Recovery Steam Generator (HRSG), a TOPGAS hydrogen-cooled generator and an Alstom STF15C triple pressure reheat steam turbine with axial exhaust and all other auxiliaries to operate the plant. The total combined power output of the two power trains is 884 MW.

The GT26B gas turbine burns a mixture of compressed air and gas. When this mixture is ignited, the products of combustion expand over the blades of the turbine which generates torque on the shaft. Each gas turbine contributes roughly 293 MW to the overall plant output. The thermal block of the GT26B gas turbine contains the compressor, two combustion chambers, a high-pressure and a low-pressure turbine, inside a common outer housing. The main feature of the GT26 gas turbine is sequential combustion. The gas turbine incorporates two combustors that operate simultaneously and sequentially, providing higher thermal efficiencies with lower temperatures and emissions.

The Heat Recovery Steam Generator (HRSG), is a boiler which is designed to use the heat from the exhaust gases of the gas turbine to create steam for the steam turbine. This increases the overall efficiency of each unit. The steam turbine adds approximately 161 MW to the overall power output of each unit. There are 3 cylinders within the steam turbine; each generate a different amount of power.
