= Severfield =

UK based structural steel contractor

Coordinates: 54.173332°N 1.353098°W

Severfield plc
- Type: Public company
- Traded as: LSE: SFR
- Industry: Construction
- Founded: 1978; 48 years ago
- Founders: John Severs; James Grice; John Waterfield
- Headquarters: York, North Yorkshire, England
- Products: Structural steel; Steel erection; Metal fabrication; MEP modules; Silo outlets; Cold-formed steel
- Revenue: ▲£454.3 million (2026)
- Operating income: ▼£15.2 million (2026)
- Net income: ▼£(35.6) million (2026)
- Website: www.severfield.com

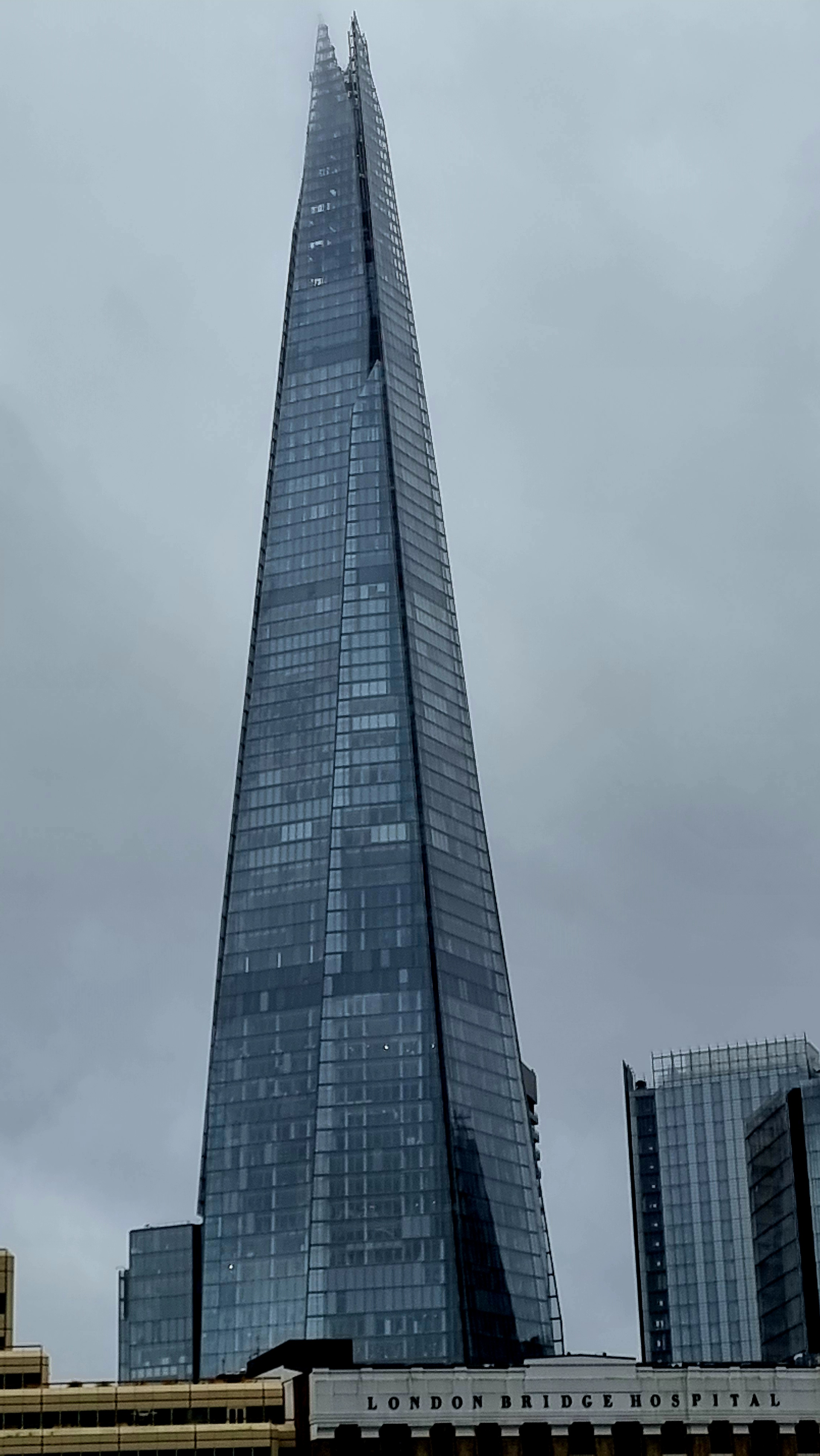
The Shard

Severfield plc is a York based structural steel contractor. By turnover it is the largest in the UK, with a capacity of 130,000 tons per year, and a further 20,000 tons in the EU. Landmark works include London's 2012 Olympic Stadium, The Shard, Wimbledon Centre Court roof, Emirates Stadium and Paris Philharmonic Hall.

The firm has acquired businesses across structural steel market sectors within the UK and EU, and it participates with JSW Group in a Mumbai based joint venture that fabricates 100,000 tons of structural steel per annum. Severfield owns 50% of Construction Metal Forming Ltd which in 2023, claimed to be the UK's largest supplier of steel decking.

== History ==
The business was founded in 1978 as a partnership named Severfield-Reeve; moved to Dalton in 1980, and incorporated as Severfield Reeve Structural Engineers Ltd in 1983. As a public company it was known from 1988 to 1999 as Severfield-Reeve plc; from 1999 to 2014 as Severfield-Rowen plc, and then adopted its current title.

=== Listings ===
In July 1988, Severfield-Reeve plc was quoted on the Unlisted Securities Market, then moved up to the London Stock Exchange on 8 June 1995.

As of 2022, Severfield plc is a component of the FTSE SmallCap Index.

=== Acquisitions and new businesses ===
2023	Rijssen based Voortman Steel Construction Holding BV purchased for £21.2 million. (Note: Founded 1968 and sister company of Voortman Steel Machinery. Voortman had previously constructed steelwork including piers E and F at Schiphol Airport; De Zalmhaven; the New Buildings at VU Amsterdam; Utrecht's Central Park; port facilities; process plant, and modular car parks. The De Haven facility at Maassluis carries out metal fabrication for the petrochemical, offshore and energy sectors. The acquisition included a 50% stake in a joint venture with HAL Investments owned, Dutch builder Van Wijnen.)
2021	Carnaby based support structure and railway steelwork contractor, DAM Structures Ltd purchased for a minimum initial cost of £12 million, potentially rising to £27 million.
2019	Bolton based nuclear and infrastructure structural steel business Harry Peers & Co Ltd purchased for a minimum initial cost of £18 million, potentially rising to £25 million. Acquisition included manufacturing site at Bolton. (Note: Founded in 1933 and involved in construction of the radio telescope at Jodrell Bank for Sir Charles Husband. Becomes Severfield's nuclear division.)
2019	Severfield begins to market discontinued products of Shepherd Building Group. (Note: Portasilo and Portastor became Siloflo, Rotoflo and Severstor.)
2015	Mamhilad based cold rolled structural steel manufacturer Composite Metal Forming Ltd purchased (50%) for a minimum initial cost of £4.1 million, potentially rising to £6.6 million. (Note: Renamed Construction Metal Forming Ltd in 2018.)
2014	JSW Structural Metal Decking Ltd (33%) indirect joint venture opened in Mumbai. (Note: Composite steel deck manufacturer, is 2/3 owned by JSW Severfield Structures Ltd, and 1/3 by a partnership associated with, former Severfield subsidiary, Structural Metal Decks Ltd.)
2010	JSW Severfield Structures Ltd (50%) joint venture opened in Mumbai. Remainder of the structural steel firm held by JSW Group.
2008	Severfield Reeve Projects Ltd launches property investment division.
2007	Ballinamallard based structural steel contractor Fisher Engineering Ltd purchased for £90 million in shares and cash. (Note: Founded by Tommy Fisher in 1950. Major structural steel projects had included the Belfast Waterfront Hall; Harry Crosbie's Dublin Convention Centre, and factories for Intel and Quinn Group. An early significant contract was the 1981 DeLorean Motor Company plant at Dunmurry. In 2002, the Duke of Edinburgh officially opened the bridge connecting Fisher Engineering's offices with its car park. He had visited Ballinamallard with his wife. Villagers commemorated the royal visit, and the Queen's Platinum Jubilee, 20 years later with a party in Severfield's car park.)
2006	Entered into Steel UK Ltd (50%) joint venture with Sheffield based steel stockholder Murray Metals Group Ltd to negotiate steel purchase prices for both partners
2006	Patented craned or self climbing work platform that attaches to steelwork at height.
2005	Sherburn based Atlas Ward Structures Ltd purchased from Bank of Scotland, and diluted shareholders, for £1.2 million. (Note: Founded in 1949, as Ward Brothers, by Frank and Wilf Ward. The business floated in 1986 before being bought by Rugby Cement, and later Kingspan. In 1996, management bought out the hot rolled structural steel fabrication part of the business, supported by 3i, for £11.3 million. It went on to construct a Coca-Cola plant in Brovary and win a Queen's Award for Export, before encountering financial difficulties and disposing of its overseas subsidiaries. William Hare Group acquired Atlas Ward's stake in Fabsec Ltd.)
2002	Thorp Arch tubular steel fabricator Tubemasters Ltd purchased for £330,000. (Note: As of 2022, no longer listed as a Severfield site.)
2002	Severfield Reeve Projects Ltd diversifies into house building.
2001	Cellular beam design software developer, Fabsec Ltd incorporated with industry partners. (Note: Following the 2024 withdrawal of founding shareholder Tata Steel Ltd, 1/3 owned by Severfield plc. Remainder held by Sherwin-Williams UK Ltd and William Hare Ltd. At 31 December 2021, Fabsec Ltd's deficit attributable to shareholders was £959,245.)
2001	Lostock based structural contractor Watson Steel Structures Ltd purchased from AMEC for £2.5 million, including land and buildings. (Note: Founded on High Street, Bolton in 1933 by Robert Watson. Fabricated structural steel for Calder Hall nuclear power station. Later work included Charles de Gaulle Airport Terminal 2E, Liverpool Street Station and the Millennium Dome. In 2000, Watson Steel had pleaded guilty to health and safety charges following the death of a worker who fell 130 foot (40 m) inside a tower block at Canary Wharf. Watson glazing frames failed on Portcullis House and Carillion's Beetham Tower, Manchester. In the latter case the sealant did not bond adequately to the powder coated frames.)
1999	Sheffield based design bureau Kennedy Watts Partnership Ltd (25.1%) purchased.
1997	Hungarian chain mail glove manufacturing business opened in Bataszek.
1997	Subsidiary Severfield Reeve Projects Ltd began to undertake construction projects outside of Severfield.
1996	Remaining 25% minority stake in Manabo (UK) Ltd purchased.
1996	Sutton-in-Ashfield based structural steel contractor, and airport terminal specialist, J N Rowen Ltd acquired for £800,000. (Note: Purchase also included the 25% of Structural Metal Decks Ltd not owned directly by J N Rowen Ltd. In 1998, Structural Metal Decks Ltd was sold for £1.8 million to its management. In 1993, Rowen and John Laing had been fined £125,000 following 1991 damage to a church. They and crane hire company Hewden Stuart Wolff had already agreed to pay £600,000 towards rebuilding costs. The crane had been working at a site across Old Thames Street when it crashed down into St James Garlickhythe and caused £2 million of damage. As of 2022, the Sutton-in-Ashfield site is occupied by ECS Engineering Services who moved there in 2014.)
1995	Meat processing safety equipment subsidiary Manabo (UK) Ltd (75%) begins trading.
1991	Steel trading business, Steel (UK) Ltd (80%) acquired.
1990	Shildon based A A Steel Erection Ltd and A & A Fabrications Ltd purchased for £943,238 in shares. (Note: A A Steel Erection Ltd renamed Steelcraft Erection Services Ltd in 1993. Freehold premises at Shildon sold in 1994.)

=== Steel (UK) Ltd and Steel UK Ltd ===
In 1991, Severfield Reeve acquired 80% of steel trading business, Steel (UK) Ltd and bought out the remaining minority shareholdings in 2009. The company ceased trading in 2002; was renamed Stable Move Ltd in 2005, and dissolved in 2013 owing £1,161,732 to Severfield plc and eliminating shareholder value.

In 2006, Severfield established Steel UK Ltd as a 50% joint venture with Sheffield based steel stockholder Murray Metals Group Ltd to negotiate steel purchase prices for both partners. The company had been incorporated in 2005 as Stable Move Ltd. Severfield and Murray bought steel at prices agreed with suppliers by Steel UK and the company did not trade itself. The joint venture was dissolved in 2013.

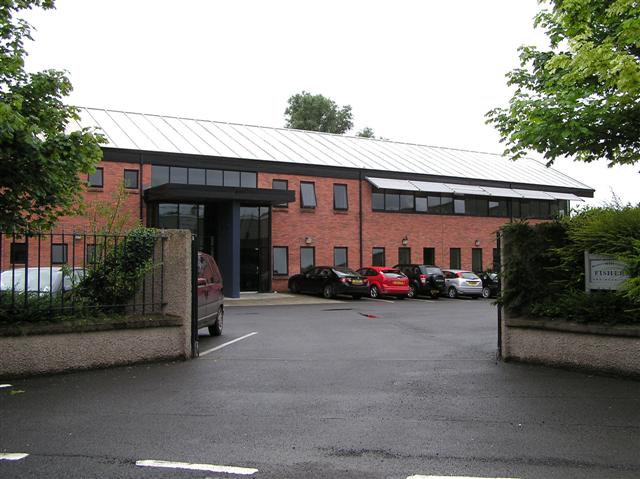
Fisher House, Ballinamallard, 2009

=== Manabo ===
In 1995, Severfield's meat processing safety equipment subsidiary Manabo (UK) Ltd began trading. Initially the business was a 75% joint venture with the original technology developer but in 1996, Severfield Reeve bought out all remaining minority shareholdings. The established Scandinavian distributor for Manabo's products agreed to purchase from the new company. Manabo manufactured at sites around Thirsk and from 1997, operated a chain mail glove factory in Bataszek, Hungary.

Such was the anticipated transformation of the structural steel business that by 1997, The Times described Severfield as a "specialist engineer and supplier of equipment for the meat and poultry processing industry". However in the same year, company founder John Severs blamed Manabo's six monthly £902,000 losses on the meat industry being "reluctant to change its ways in health and hygiene".The glove business and company were sold in 2000 after a further £2 million loss in 1998, and asset write-down of £2.8 million in 1999.

=== Severfield Reeve Projects Ltd ===
In 1991, subsidiary Severfield Reeve Projects Ltd was incorporated, initially to carry out construction at Severfield's plants. It began to undertake main contracting for others in 1997.

1998	Express Terminals Ltd (Ripon), National Tube Stockholders Ltd (Dalton) and Talking Pictures Cards Ltd (Thirsk)
2000	Northern headquarters for the National Crime Squad and office building at Thirsk for Teleware
2001	Turnkey relocation for Dowding & Mills at York
2002	Warehouse for Encore Direct Ltd in York; office in Wakefield; premises for Union Trucks, and a school for North Yorkshire County Council
2006	Thirsk Rural Business Centre (£5.2 million) and Belmont Nursing Home (£5.1 million)

Severfield Reeve Projects diversified into house building in 2002, purchasing, on its own account, a site in Bagby for two traditional, five bedroom dwellings with 1 acre (0.40 ha) gardens.

In 2008, it launched a property investment division with the purchase of distribution warehouses from Royal Mail and the RNLI for £7.1 million. The value of the initial investments was written down by £2.1 million in 2009. New projects and investments by Severfield Reeve Projects Ltd stopped in 2009, and it closed in 2011.

=== Kennedy Watts Partnership Ltd ===
In 1999, Severfield purchased 25.1% of Sheffield based design bureau Kennedy Watts Partnership Ltd for £464,000 in shares and cash. The shareholding was restructured in 2008 so that it was held through an intermediary, Last Exit Ltd. Kennedy Watts Partnership Ltd was placed into administration in 2013; into liquidation in 2014, and dissolved in 2016 with a deficit to creditors of £292,000 and elimination of all shareholder stakes.

=== Deck riders ===
In 2006, Severfield patented a craned or self climbing work platform that attaches to steelwork at height, and mounts its own powered access platform. The apparatus was invented to assist erection of steel structures where conditions are not suitable for safe operation of conventional access equipment. In 2009, the work platform project was abandoned and £2.4 million development costs written off.

Severfield went on to develop 'deck rider' static base boom lifts with access platform manufacturer Niftylift. These can be repositioned by crane onto buildings under construction to sit in the steel decking. By 2009, they had been used on Severfield's Shard and Heron Tower sites facilitating safe erection speeds of a storey every seven days - without waiting for concrete floors to set. By 2011, Severfield had purchased 20 of the machines.

As of 2025, deck riders are commercially available.

=== Tonnage ===
Severfield structural, fabricated steel output, relative to capacity and UK market:

	Severfield output (UK and Europe) (1,000 tons) (Note: To March)	Severfield capacity (UK and Europe) (1,000 tons)	Total consumed (UK) (1,000 tons) (Note: Compiled by British Constructional Steelwork Association, to end of December)
2016	85	150	892
2017	90	150	876
2018	75	150	879
2019	80	150	858
2020	95	150	683
2021	95	165	803
2022	95	165	803
2023	115	150 (Note: 130,000 tons UK, 20,000 tons Europe)	894
2024	100	150	N/A
2025	95	150	N/A

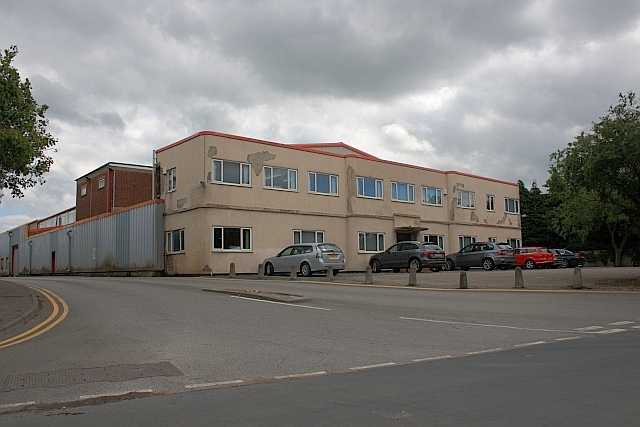
Sherburn works, 2011

=== Accident statistics ===
Severfield plc's RIDDOR ratios have improved, and are lower than its industry average. Senior executives are remunerated according to the accident frequency rate (Note: Accident frequency rate measured by reportable injuries, leading to at least 3 days off work, per 100,000 hours worked (or roughly a lifetime employment)) of the business units they oversee.

	Severfield AFR	Industry AFR (Note: Collated by British Constructional Steelwork Association)
2013	0.55	
2014	0.57	0.4
2015	0.21	
2016	0.25	
2017	0.24	
2018	0.22	
2019	0.11	>0.3
2020	0.15	0.3
2021	0.18	
2022	0.16	>0.16
2023	0.14	
2024	0.12	
2025	0.08	

== Locations ==
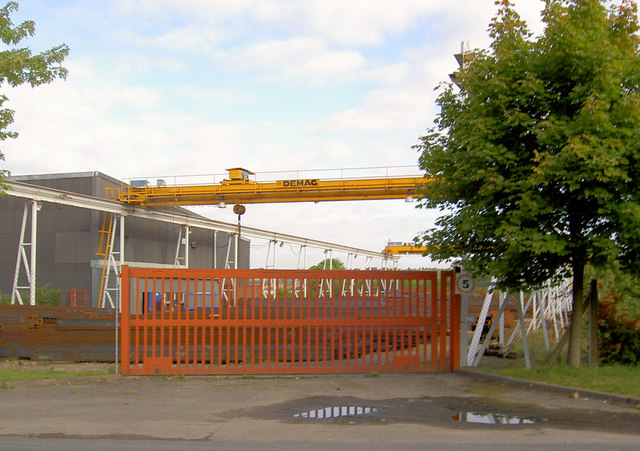
Lostock site, 2007

As of 2025, Severfield plc is headquartered in York, close to its factory on the former RAF Dalton near Thirsk where it is a significant employer. It also manufactures in Sherburn, Lostock, Carnaby, Ballinamallard, Rijssen and Maassluis, and has offices at Breda, Moor Row, Newport and Glasgow.

Joint ventures JSW Severfield Structures Ltd and JSW Structural Metal Decking Ltd are located in Mumbai.

The Construction Metal Forming Ltd cold formed construction steel joint venture manufactures steel decking, and light gauge framing, in Mamhilad and Magor.

== Project gallery ==
=== Stadia and arena ===
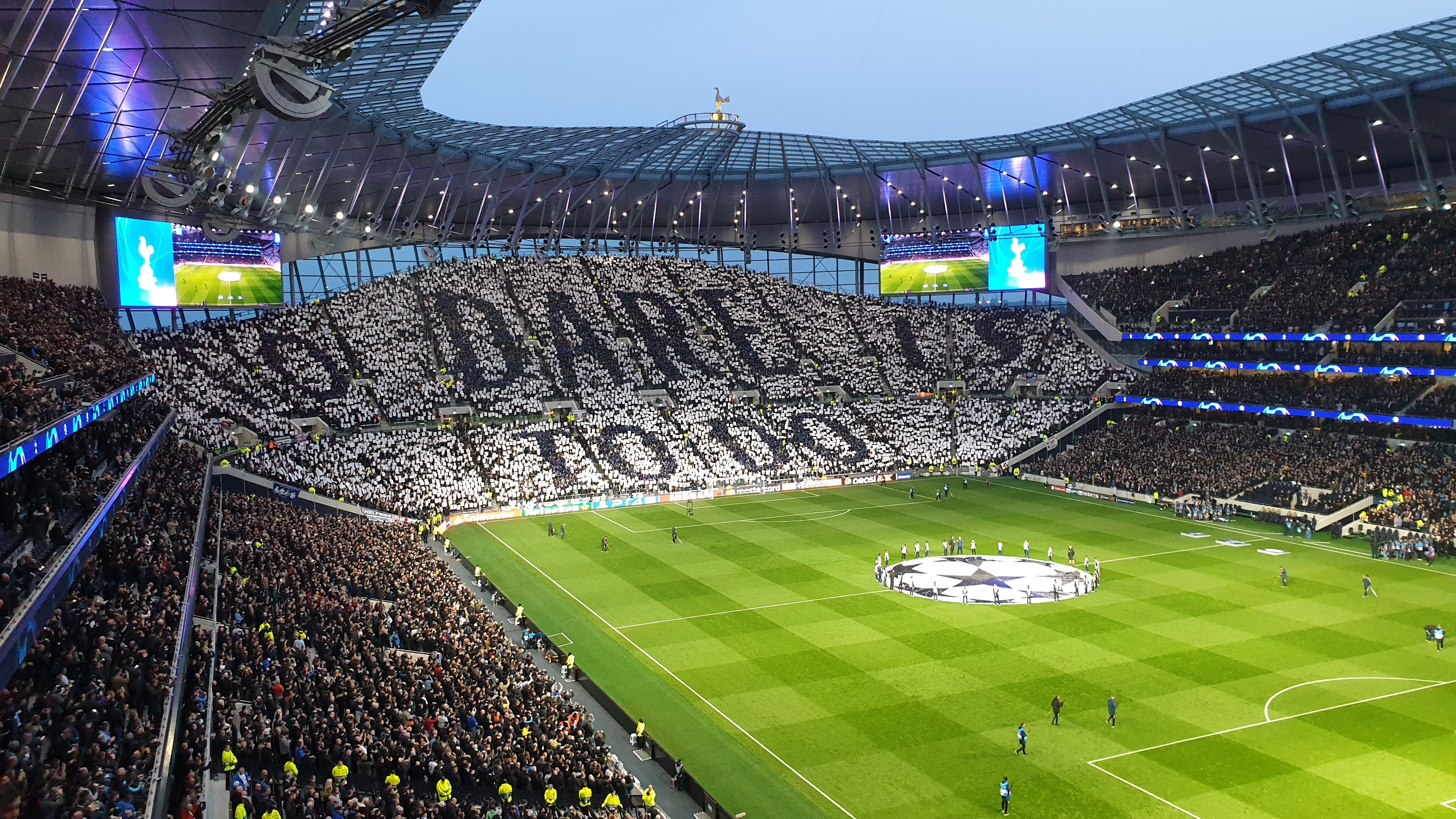
Tottenham Hotspur Stadium

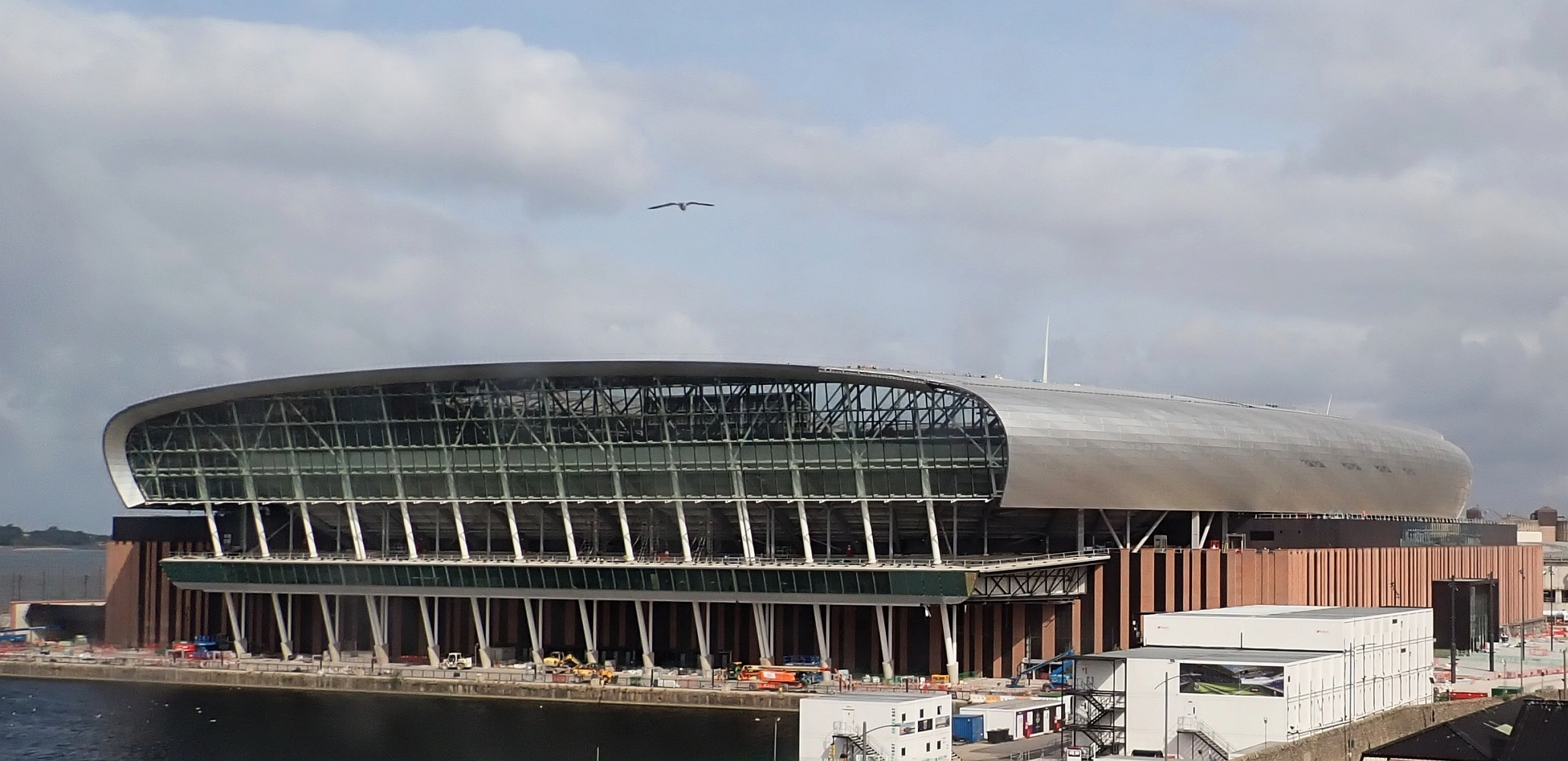
Everton Stadium

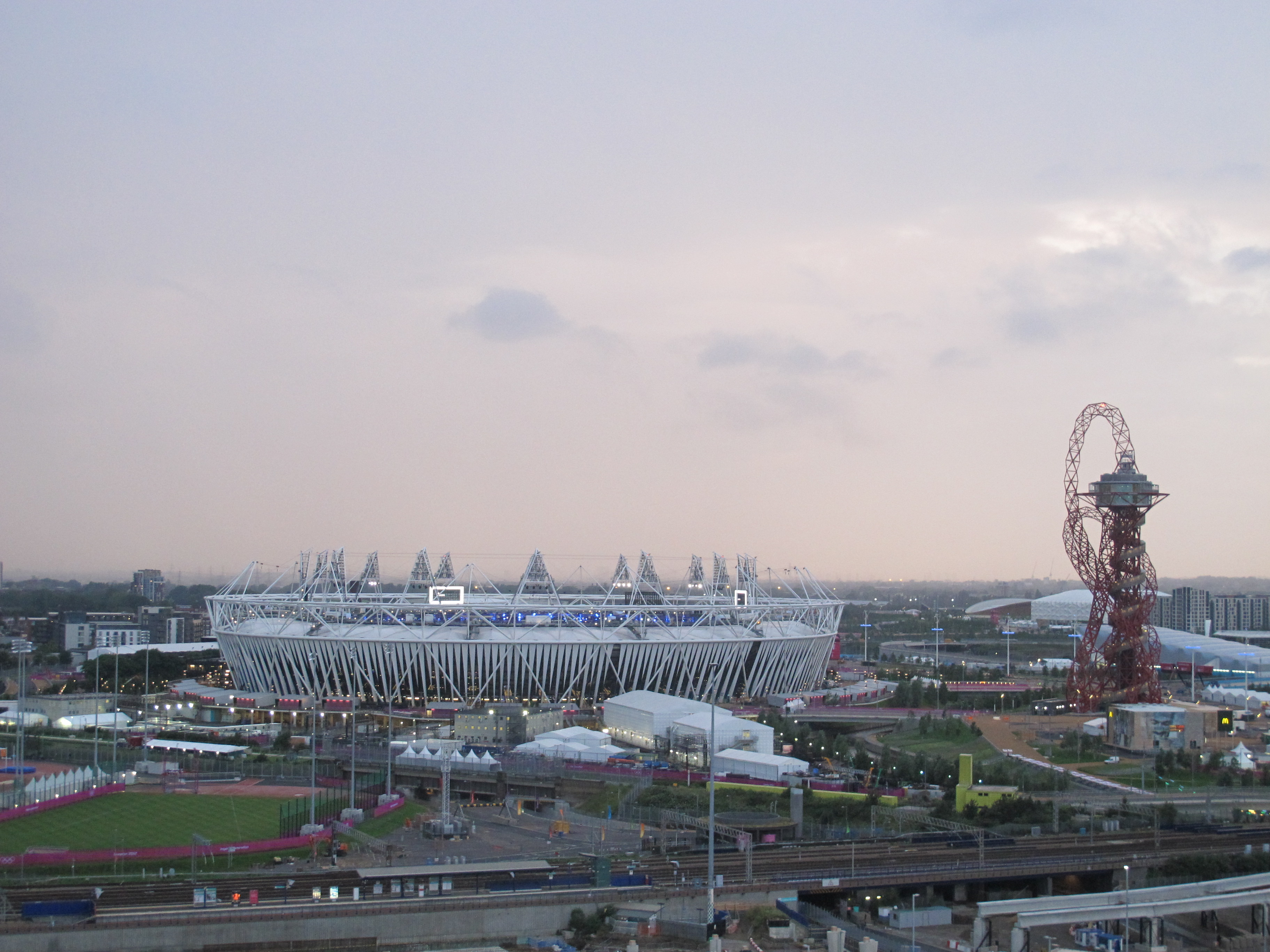
London 2012 Olympic Stadium (with ArcelorMittal Orbit in foreground)

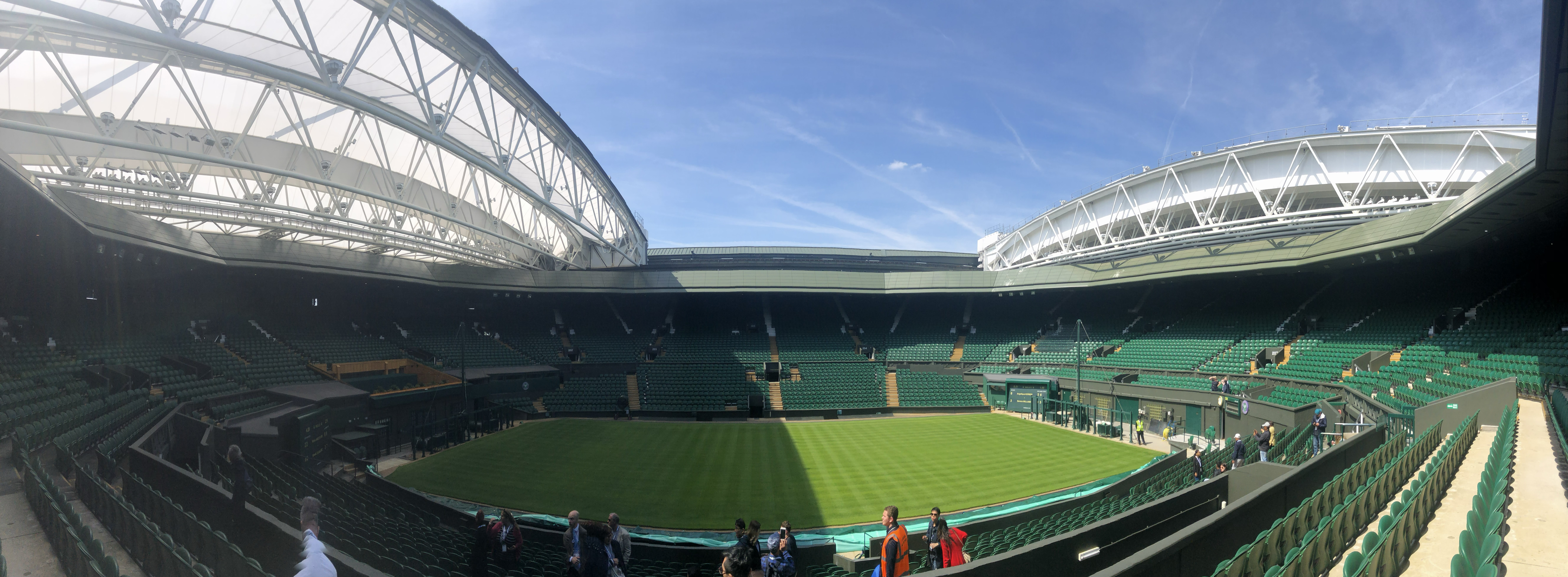
Wimbledon Centre Court Roof

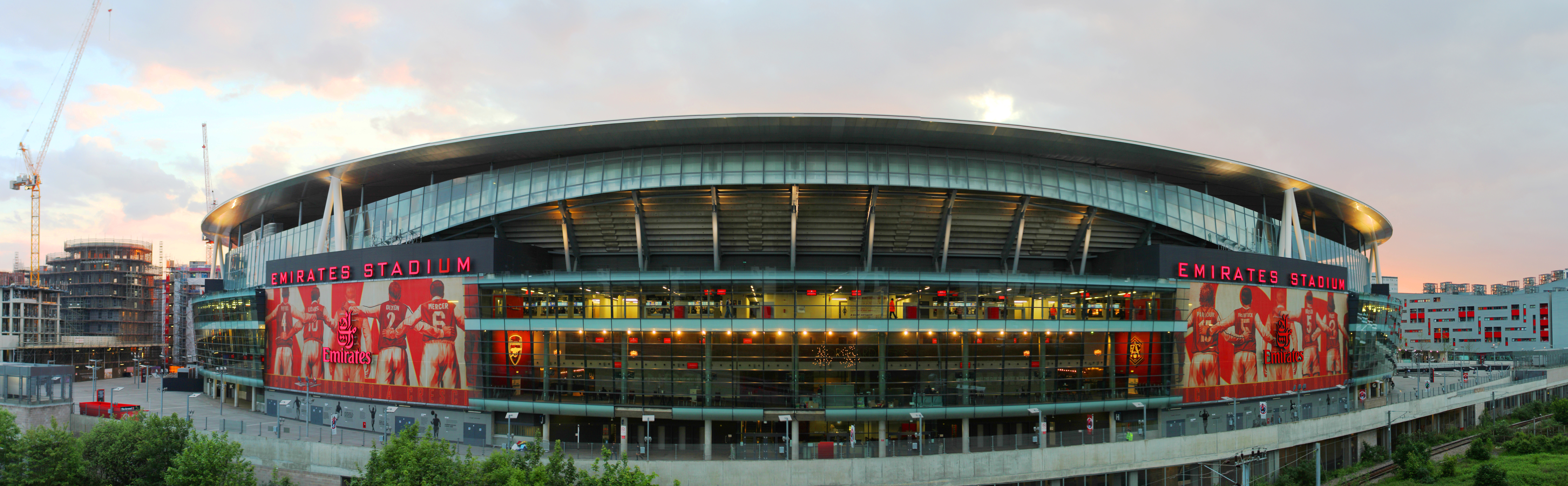
Emirates Stadium

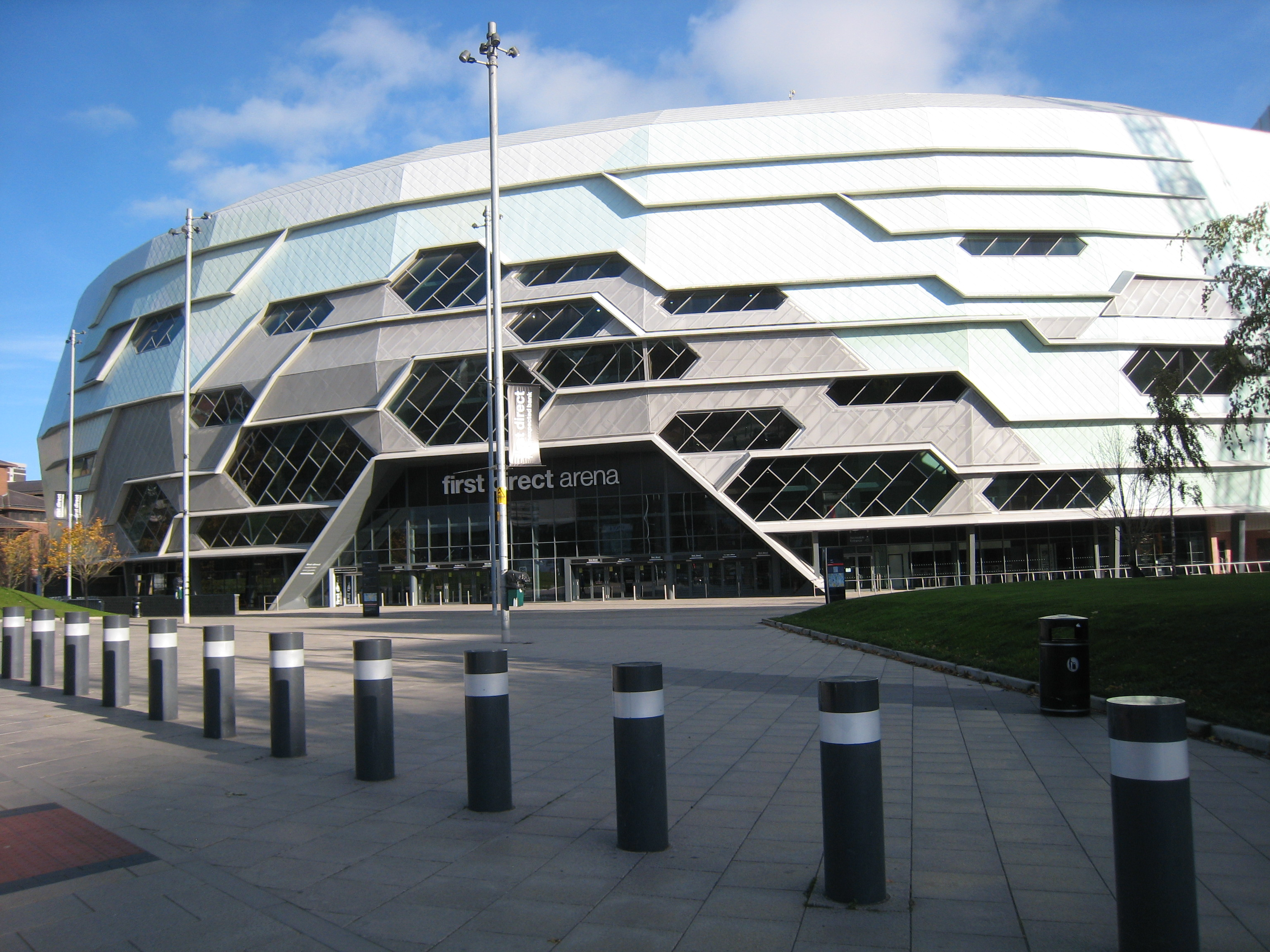
First Direct Arena

=== Transport ===
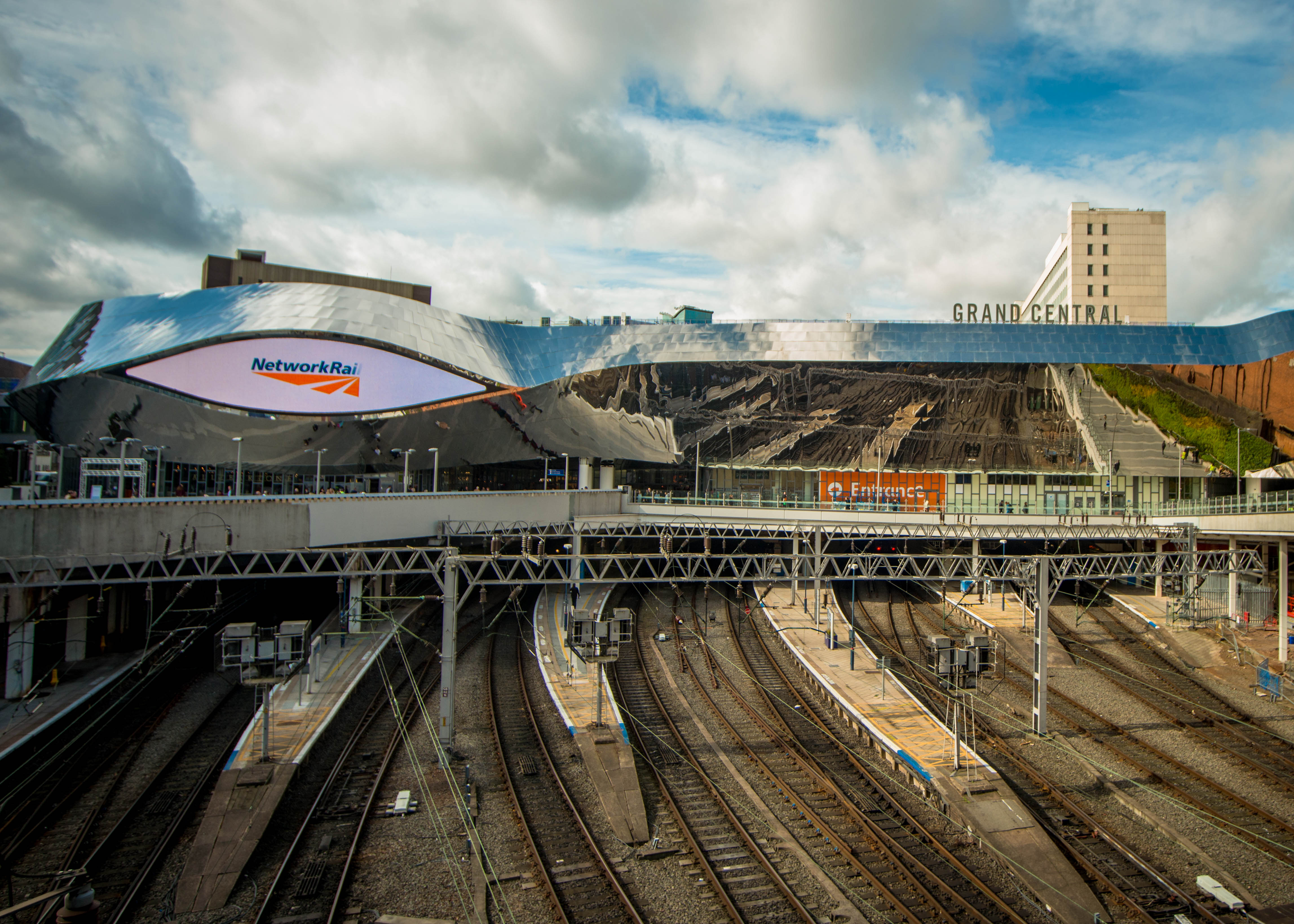
Birmingham New Street Station

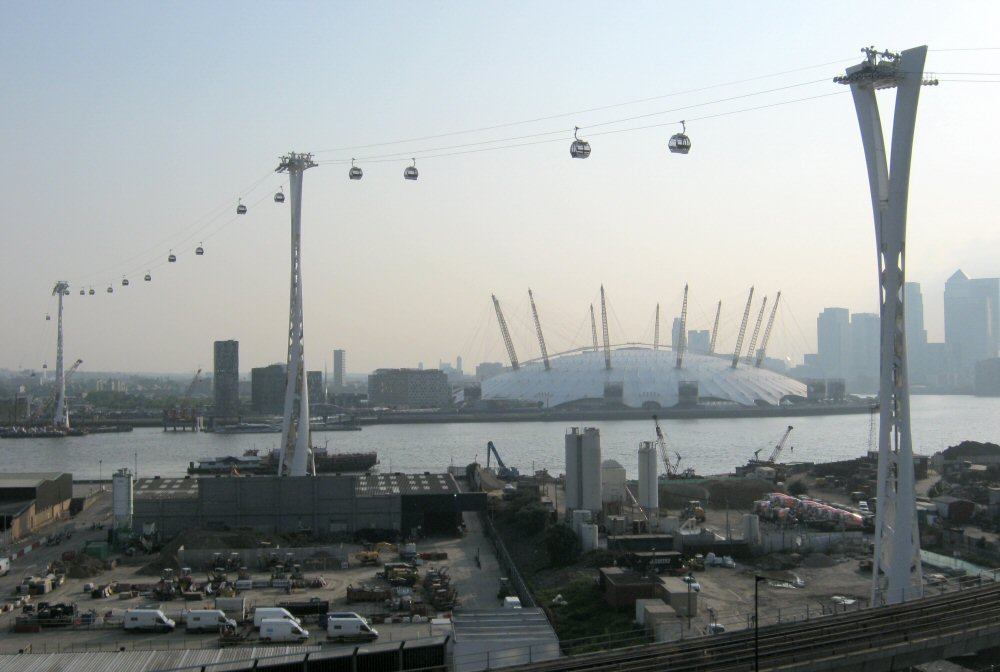
Towers for the London Cable Car

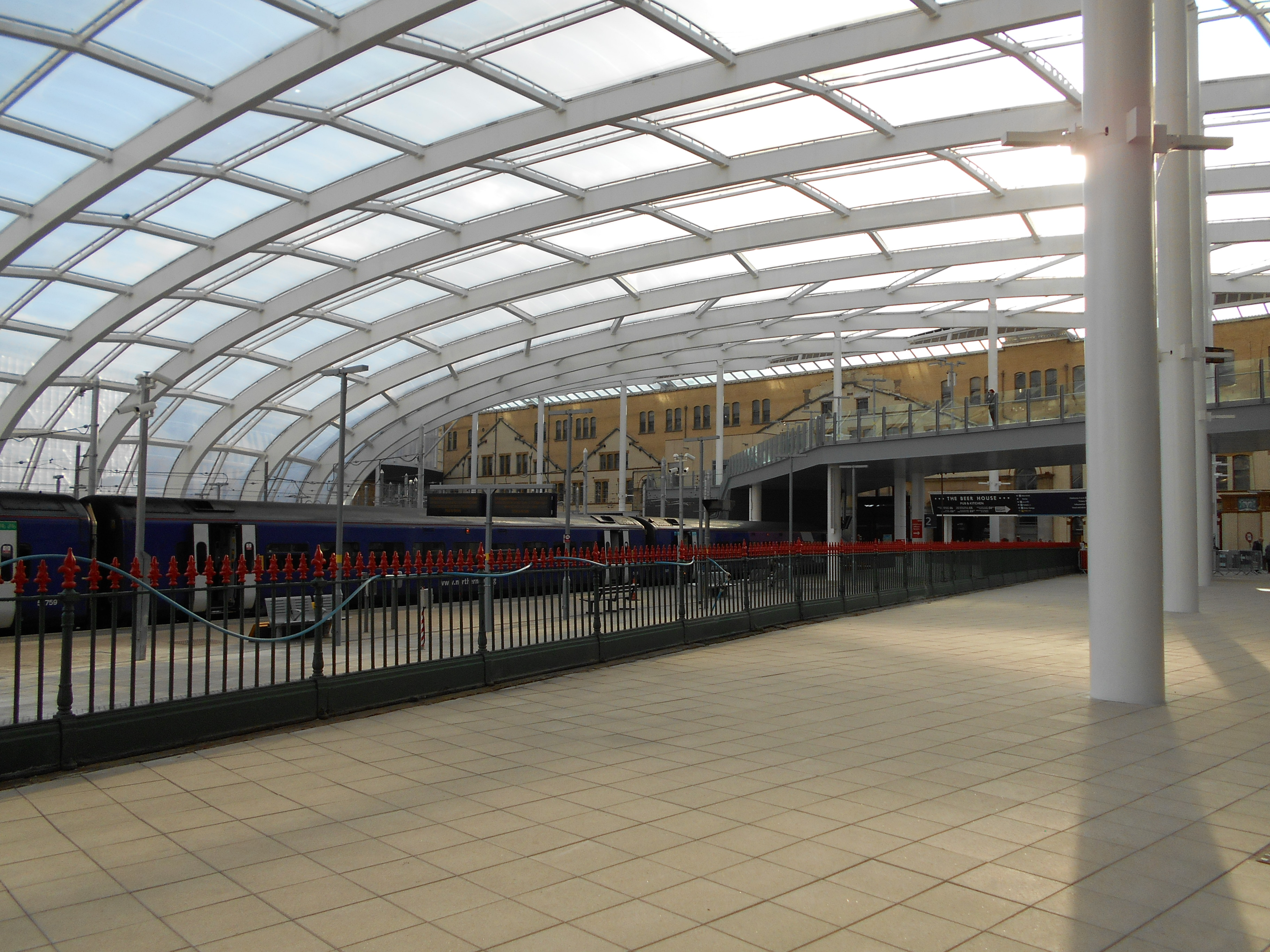
Manchester Victoria Station Renovation

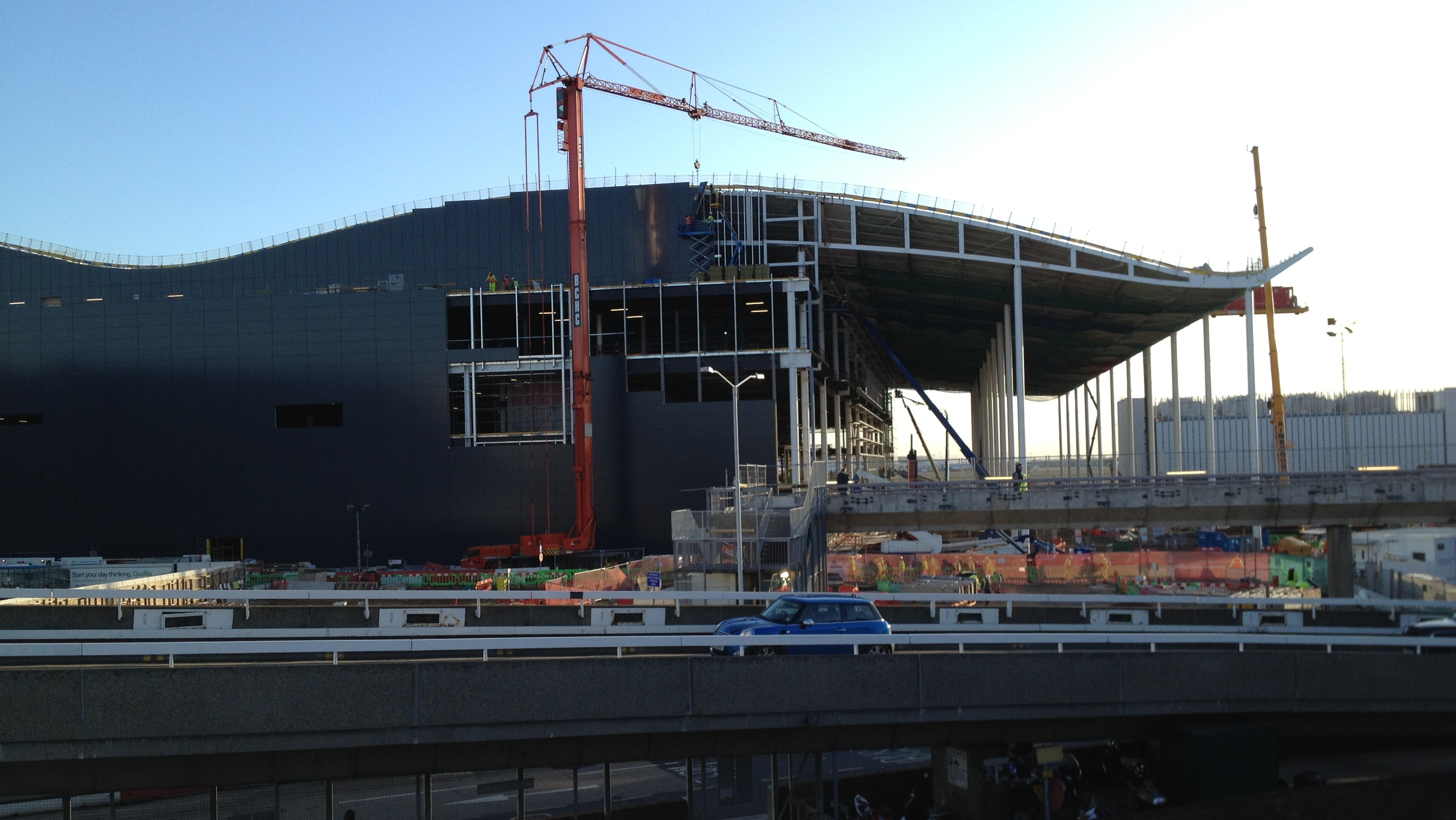
Heathrow Terminal 2

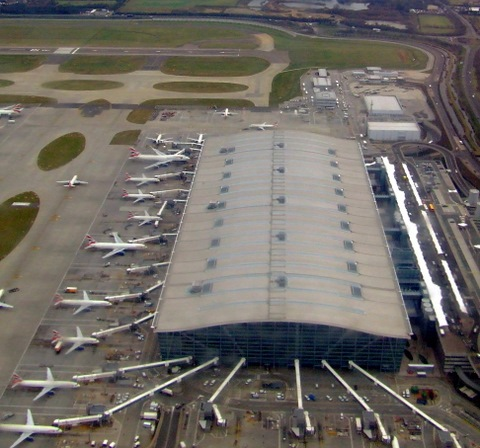
Heathrow Terminal 5

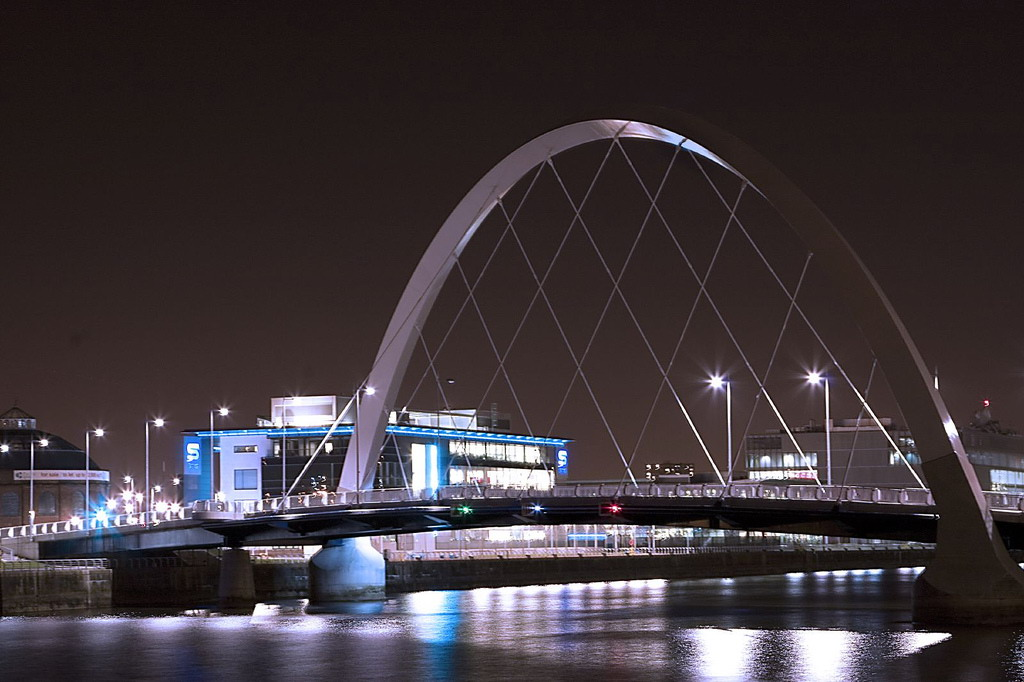
Clyde Arc

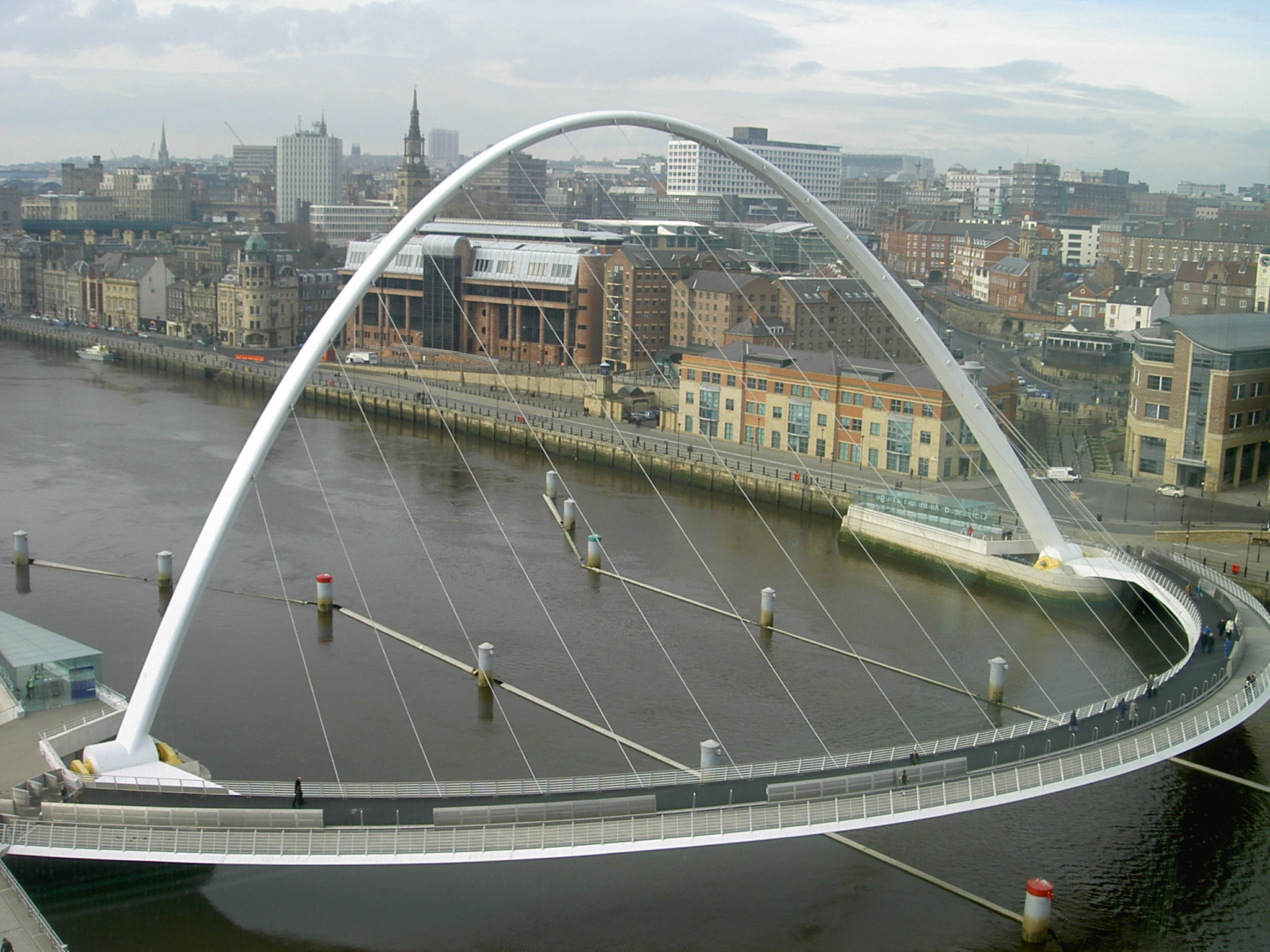
Baltic Gateshead Millennium Bridge

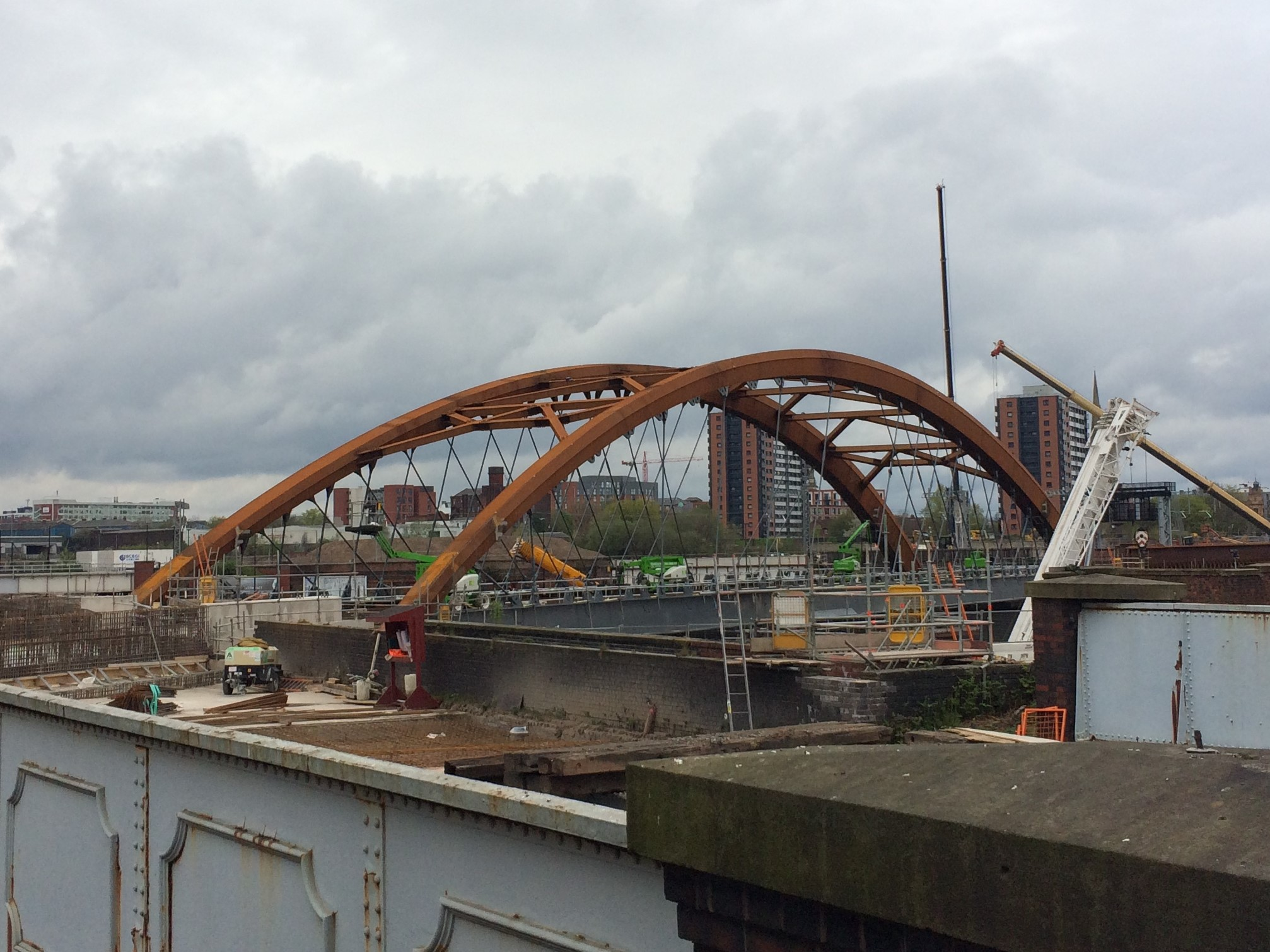
Ordsall Chord

=== Buildings ===
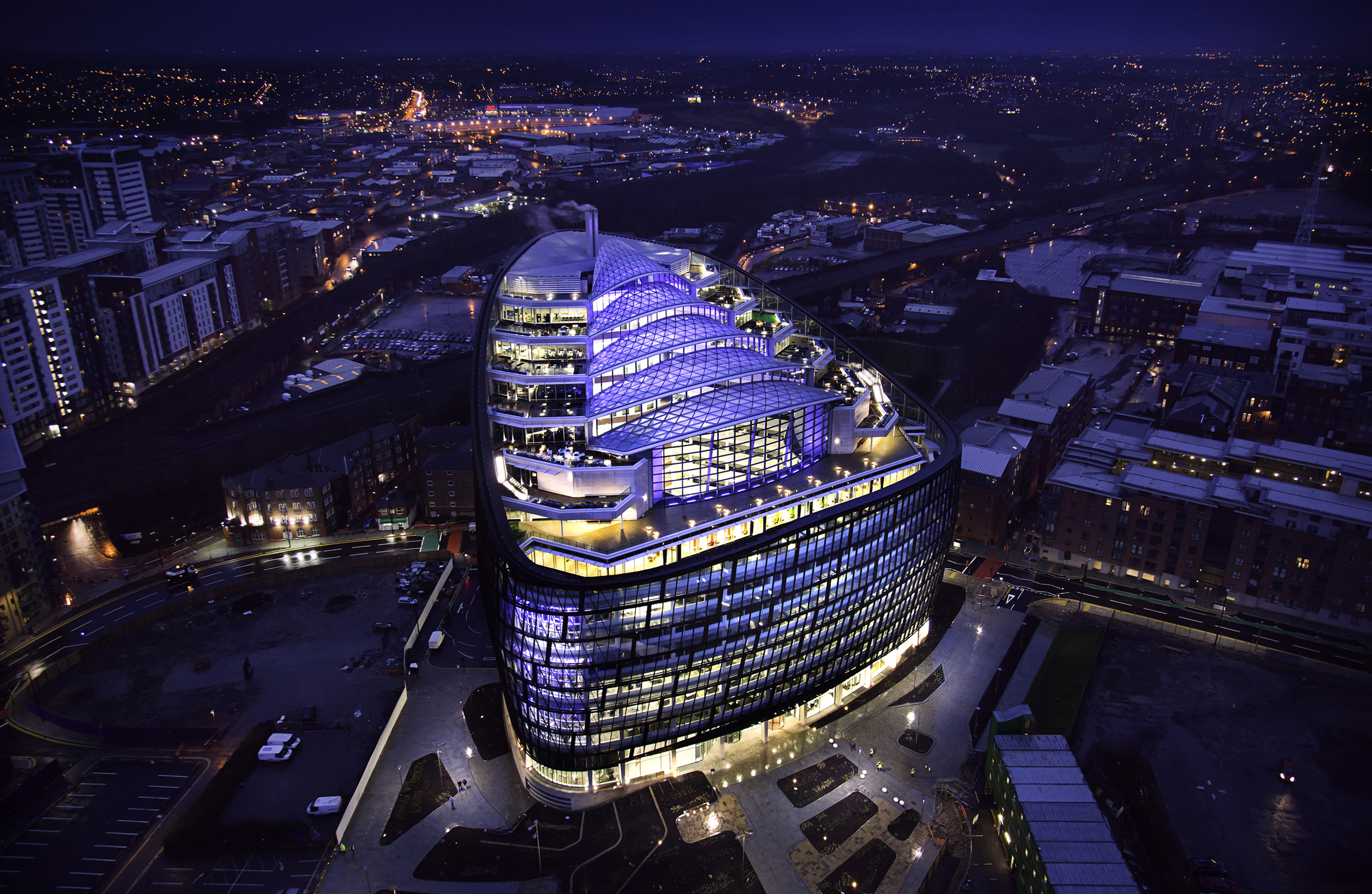
One Angel Square

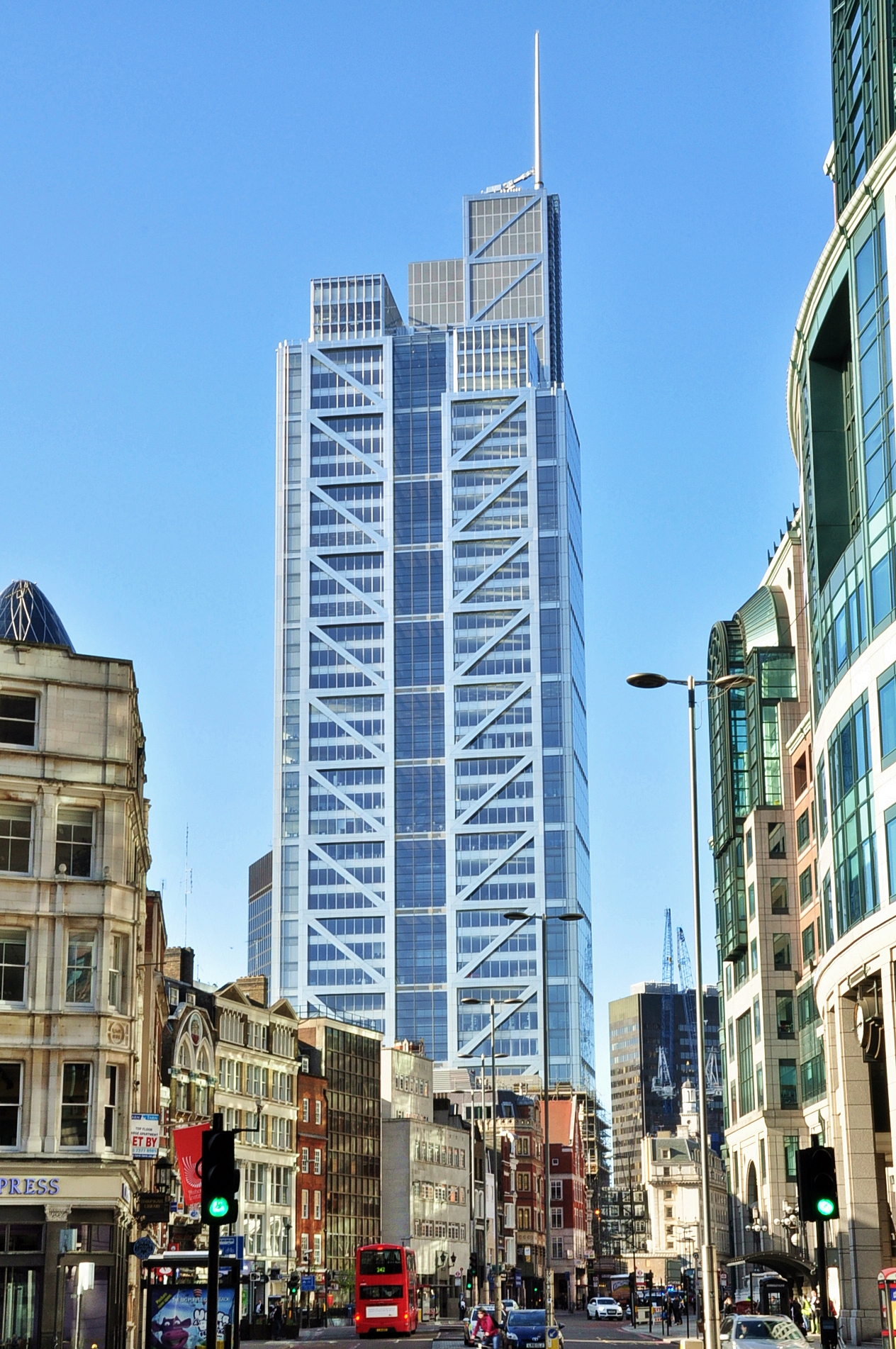
Heron Tower

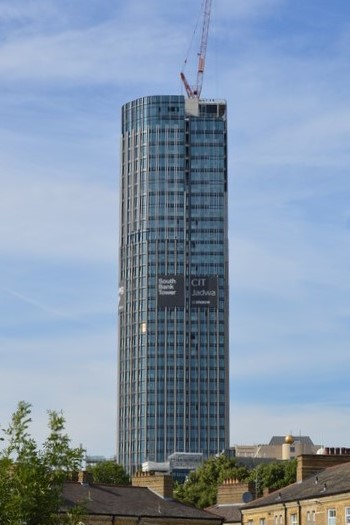
South Bank Tower extension

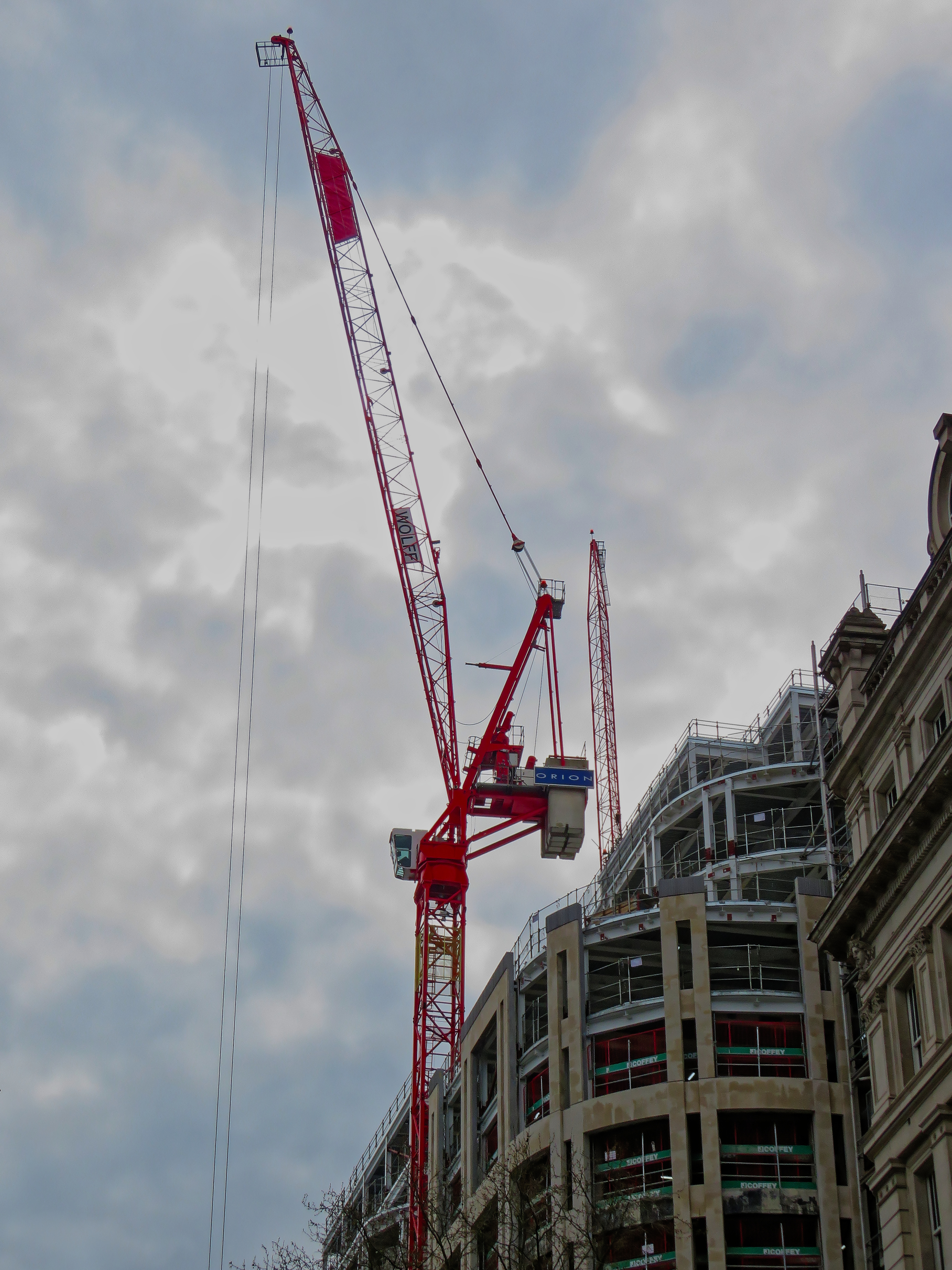
81 Newgate Street retrofit

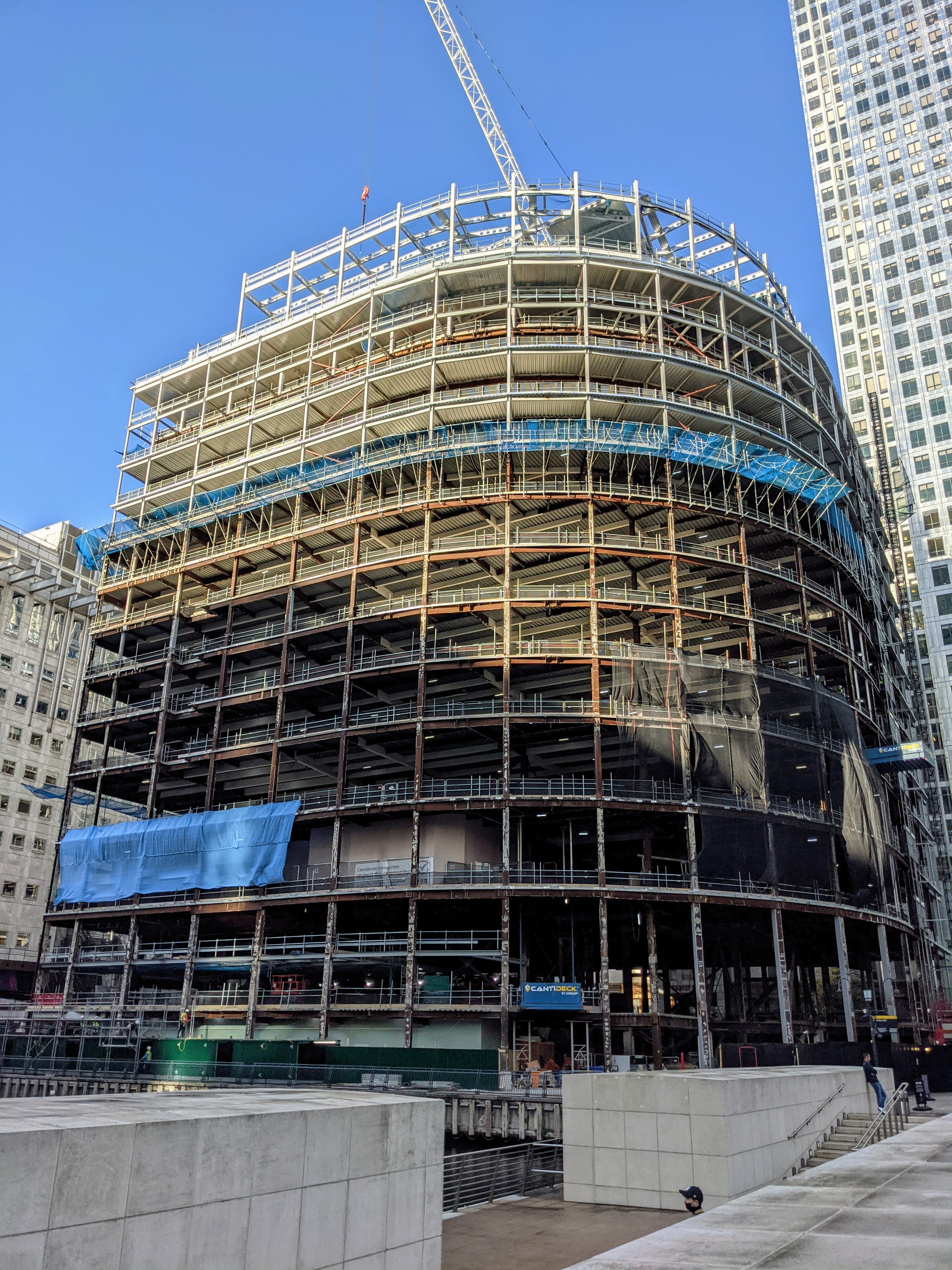
30 South Colonnade three floor addition

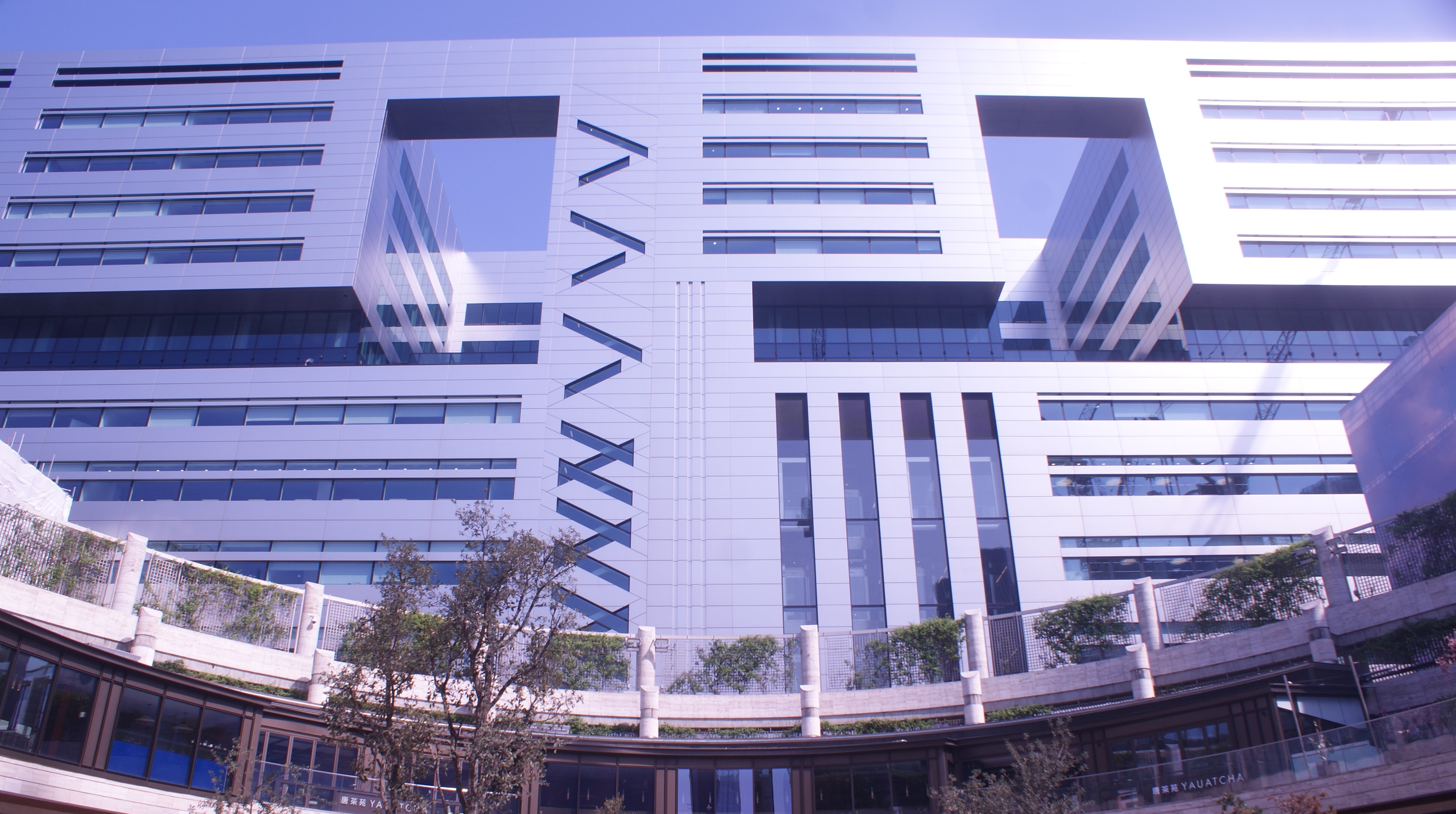
5 Broadgate

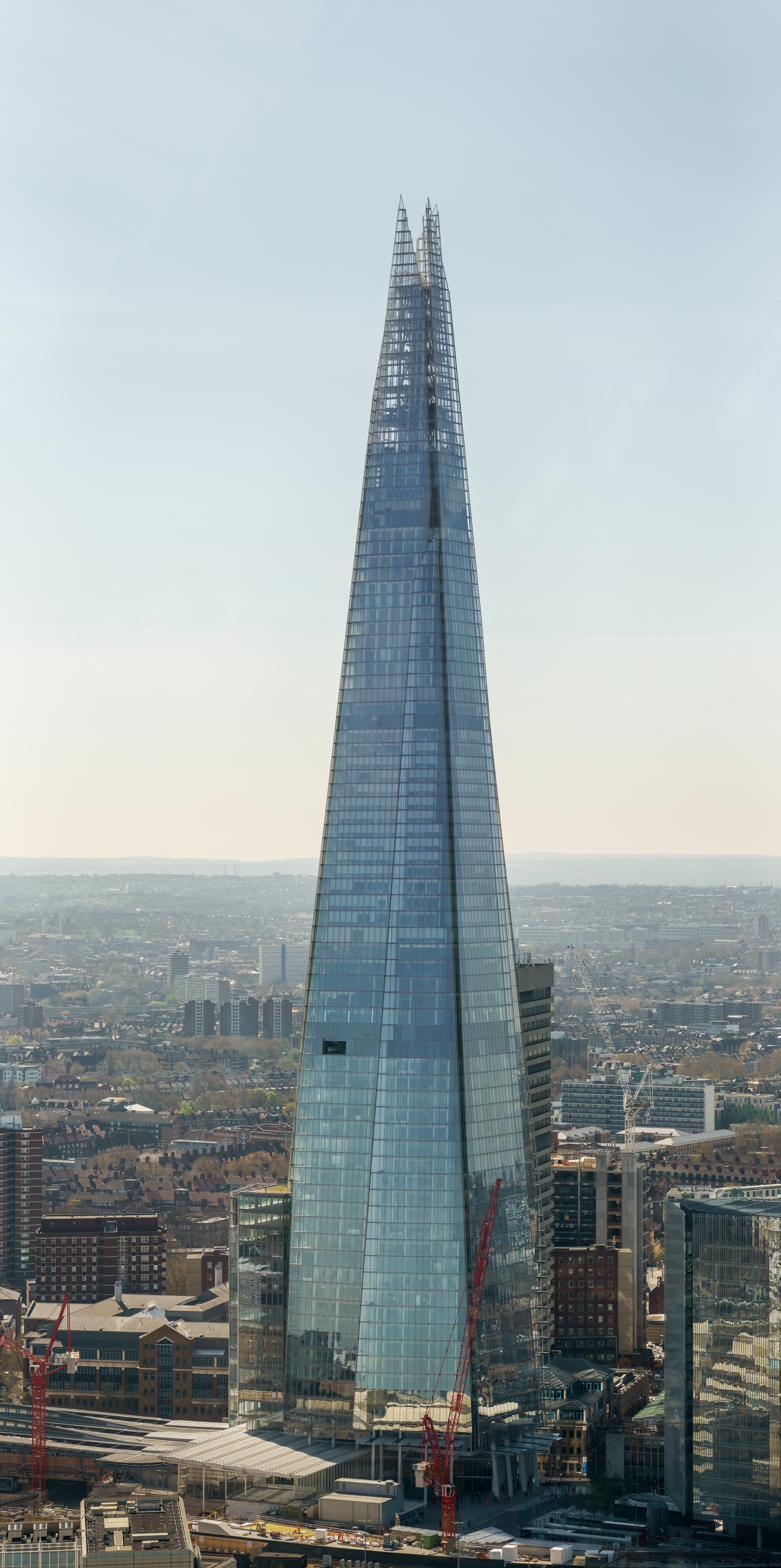
The Shard

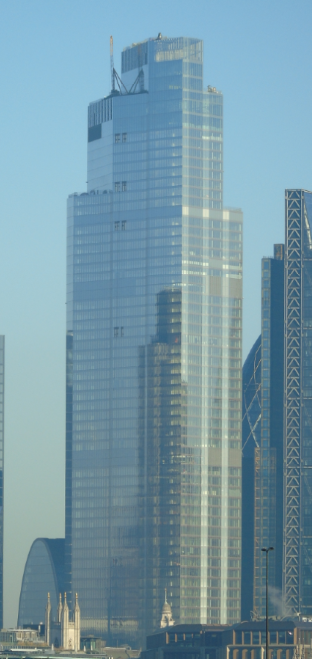
22 Bishopsgate

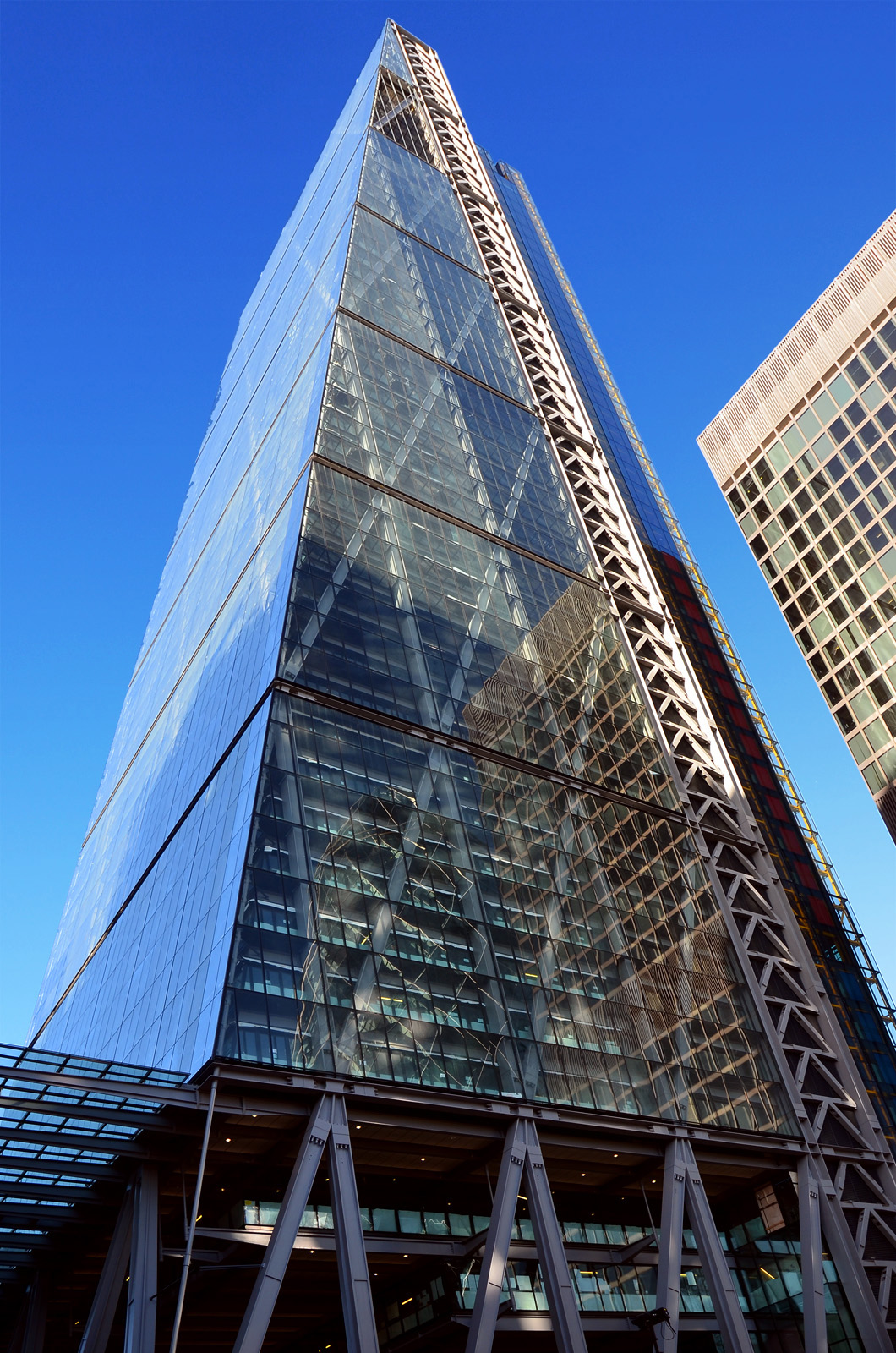
Leadenhall Tower

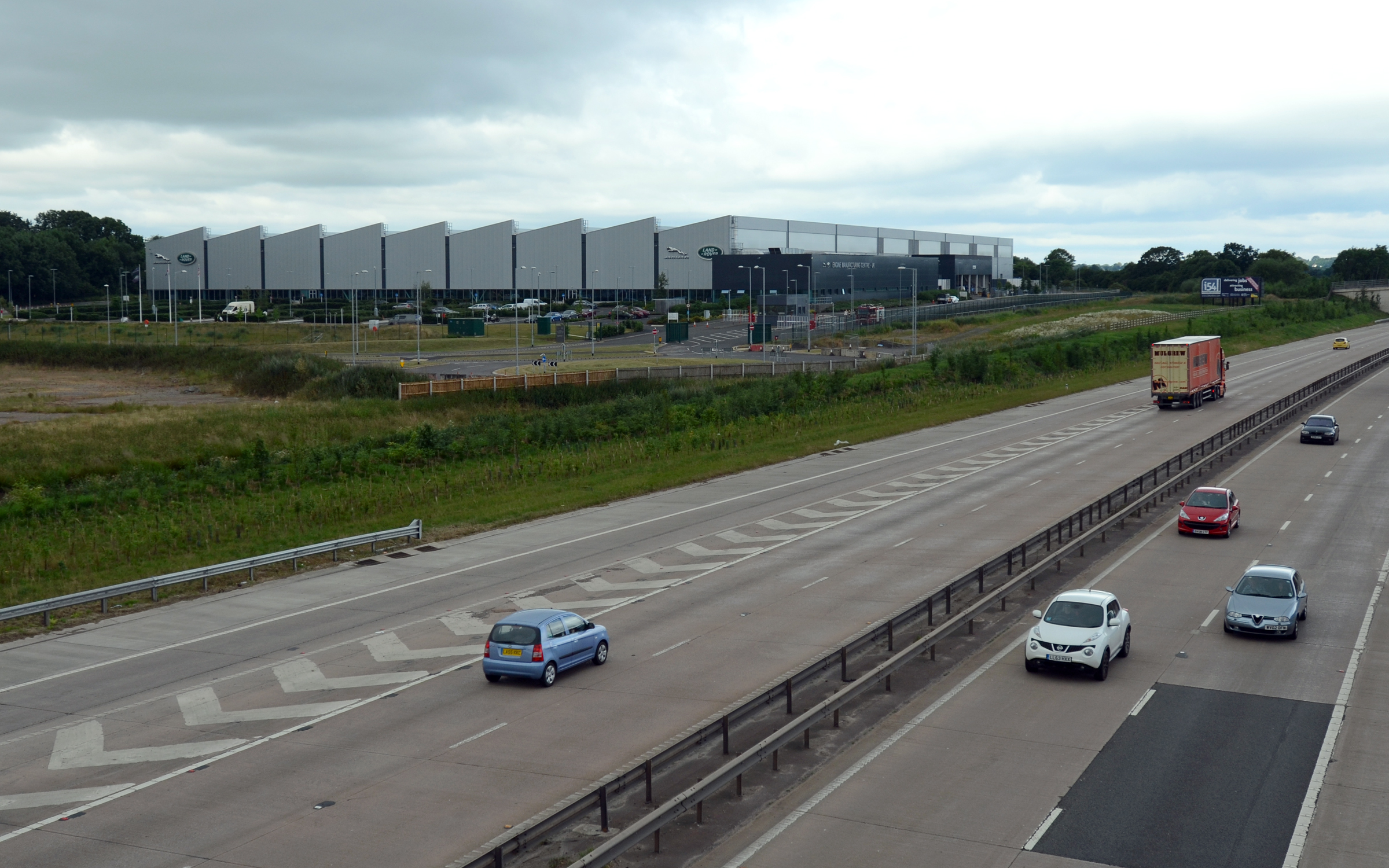
Jaguar Land Rover Engine Manufacturing Centre

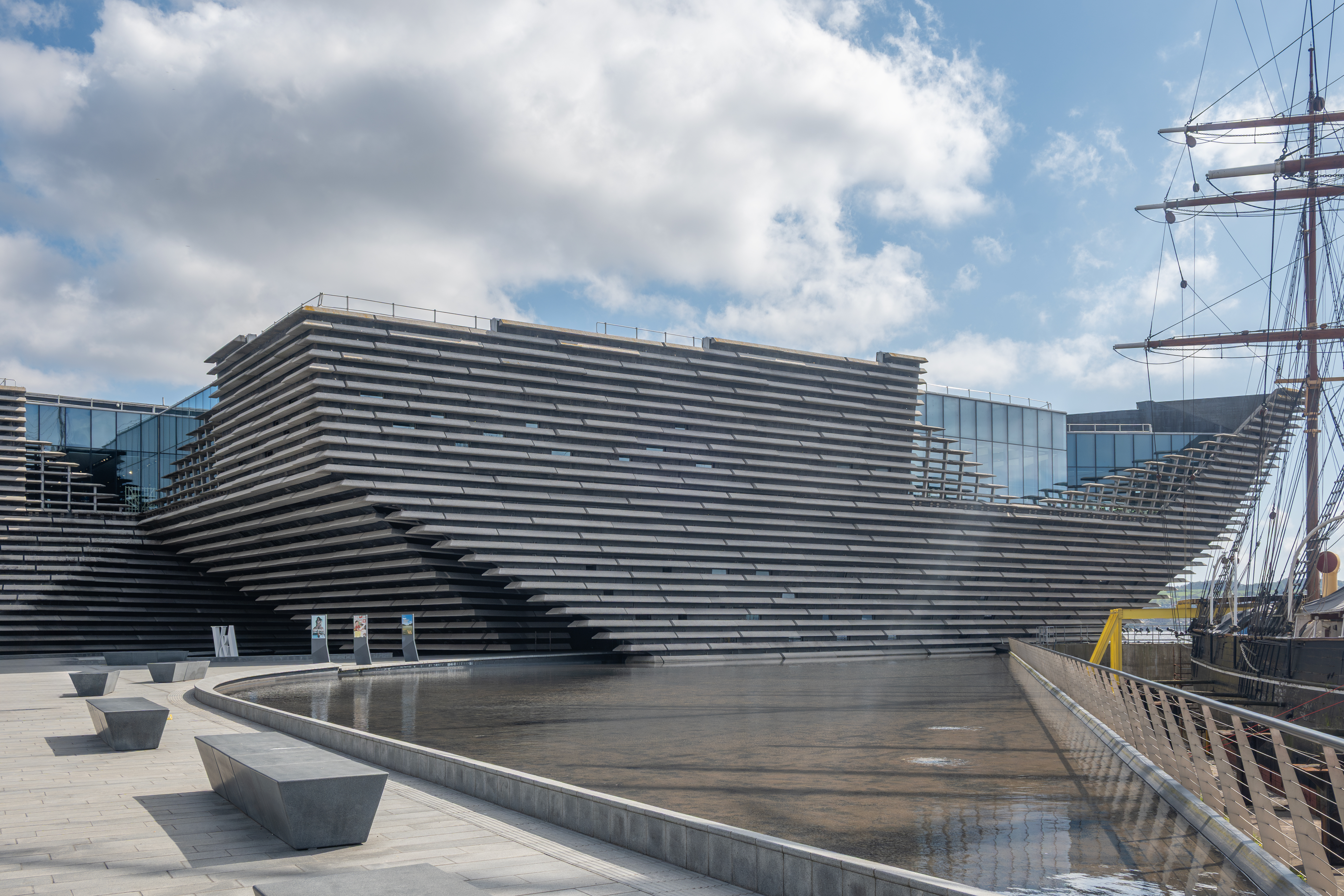
V & A Dundee

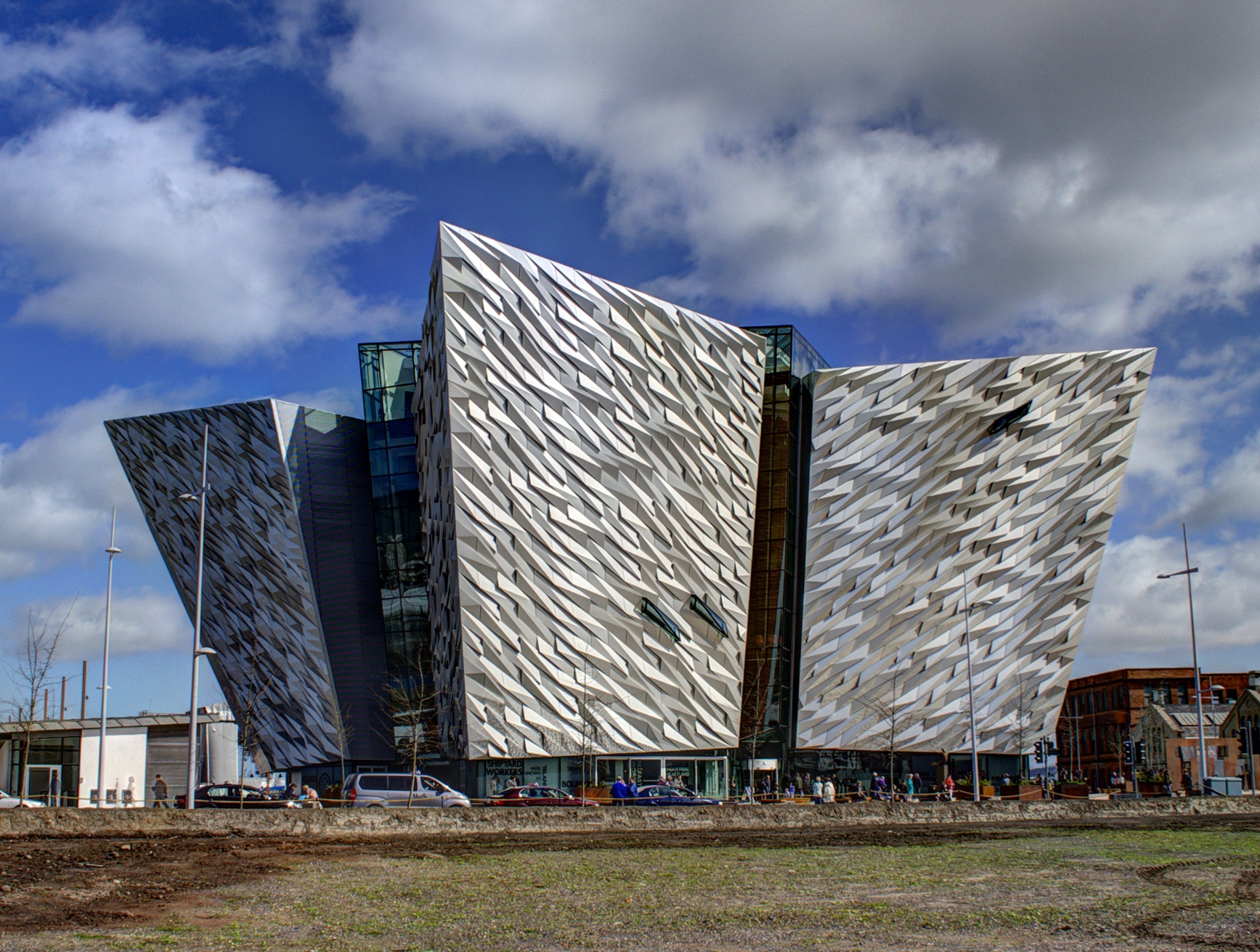
Titanic Belfast

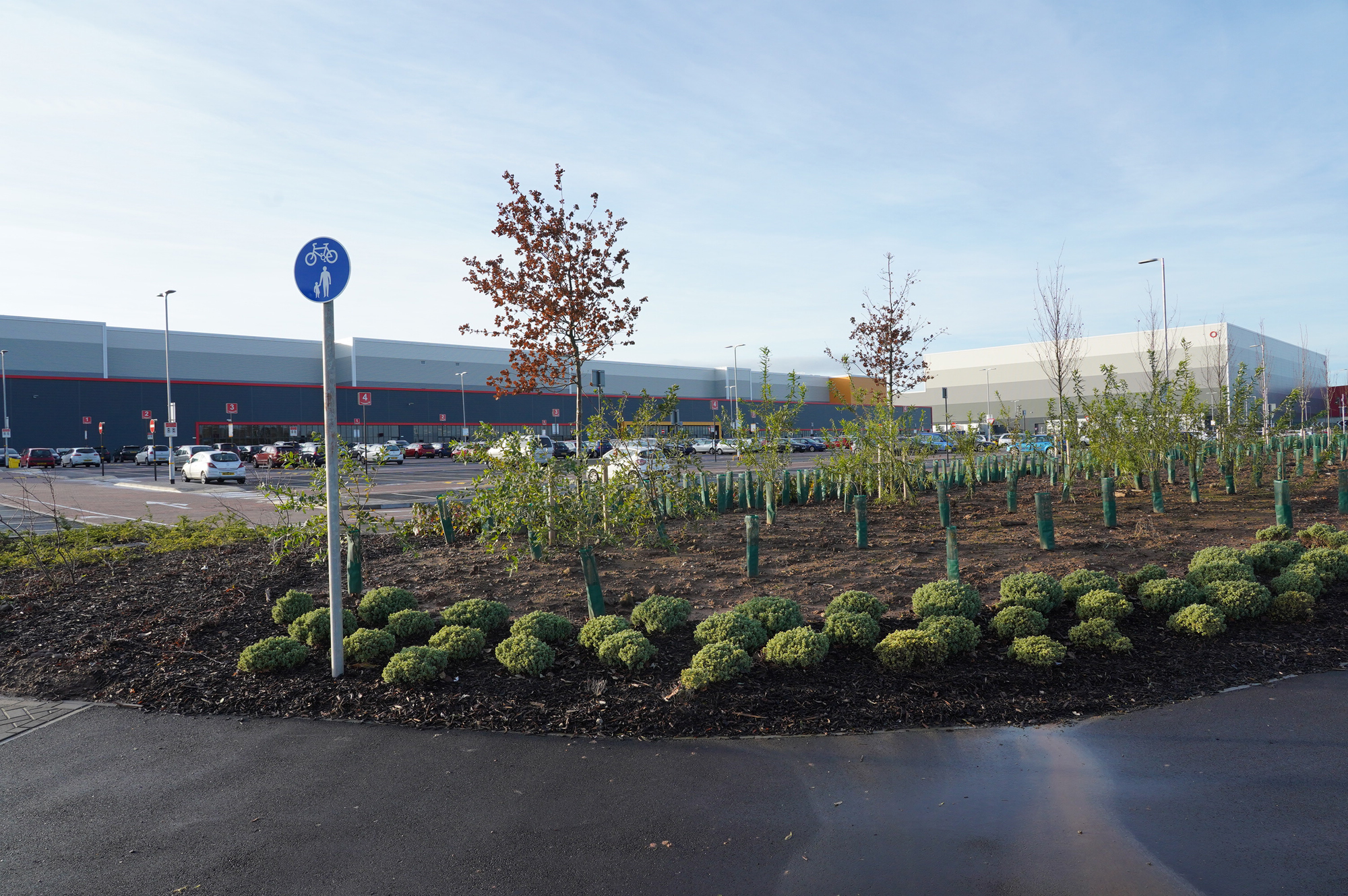
Amazon, Kegworth

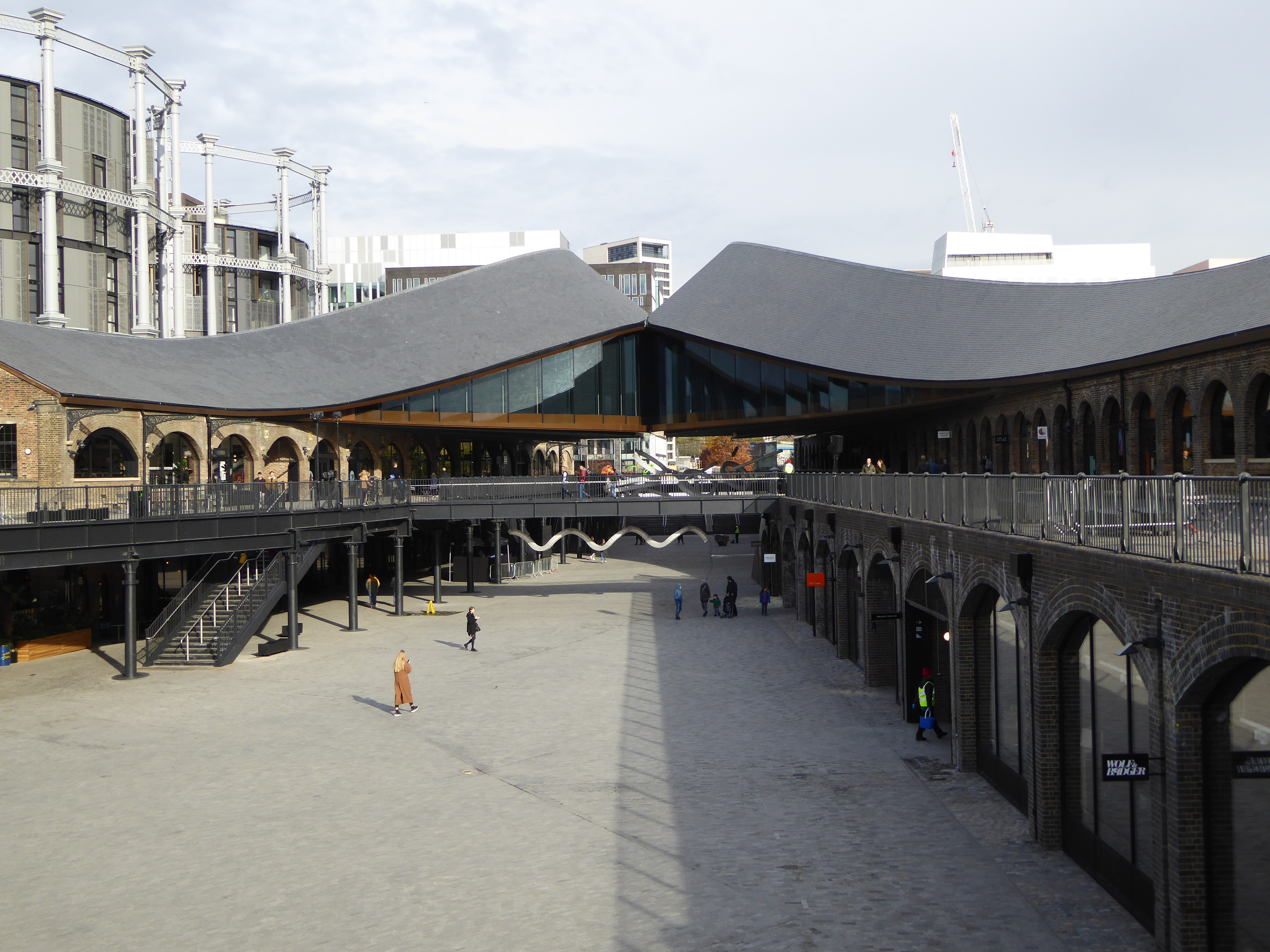
Coal Drops Yard

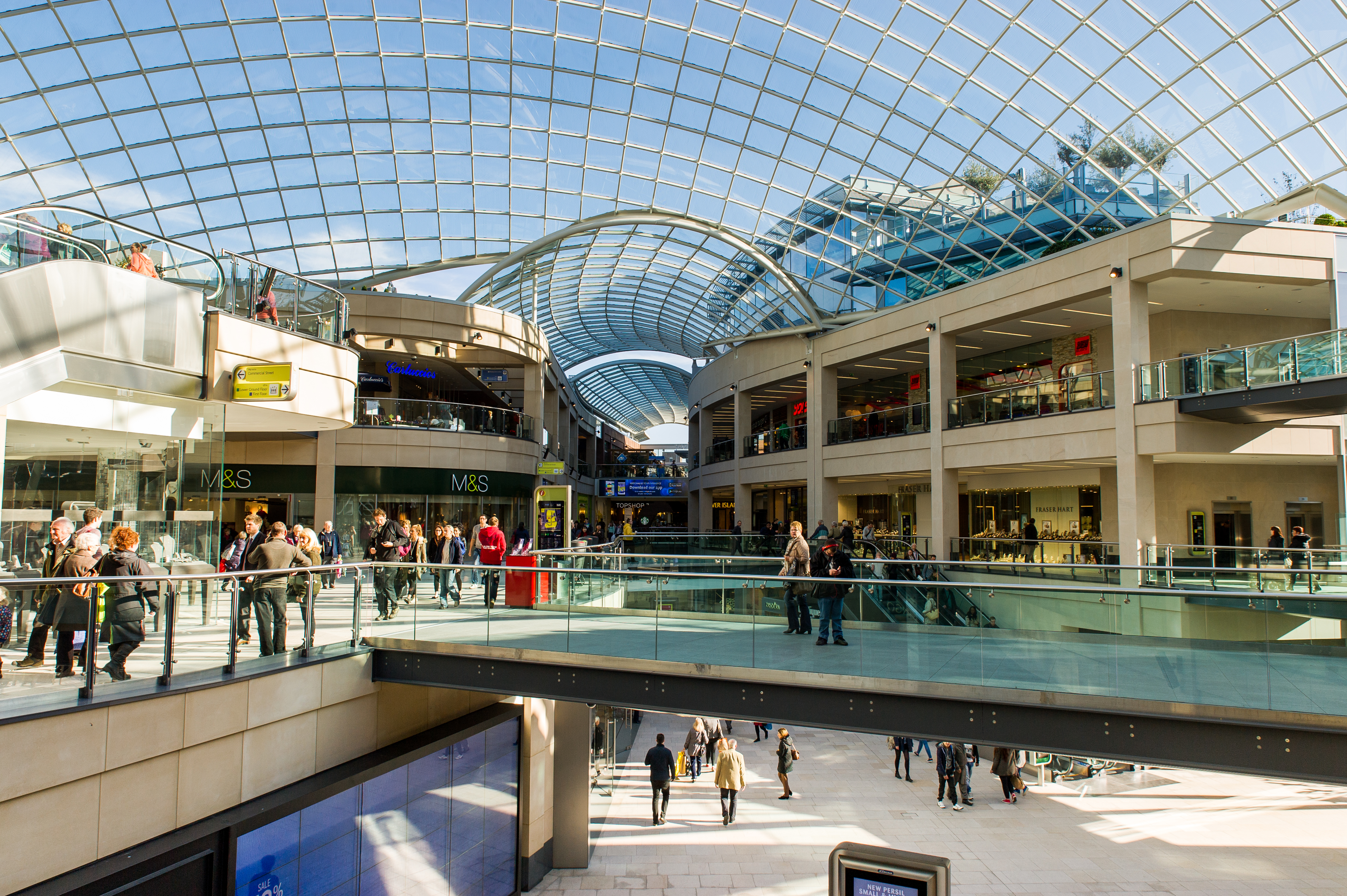
Trinity Centre, Leeds

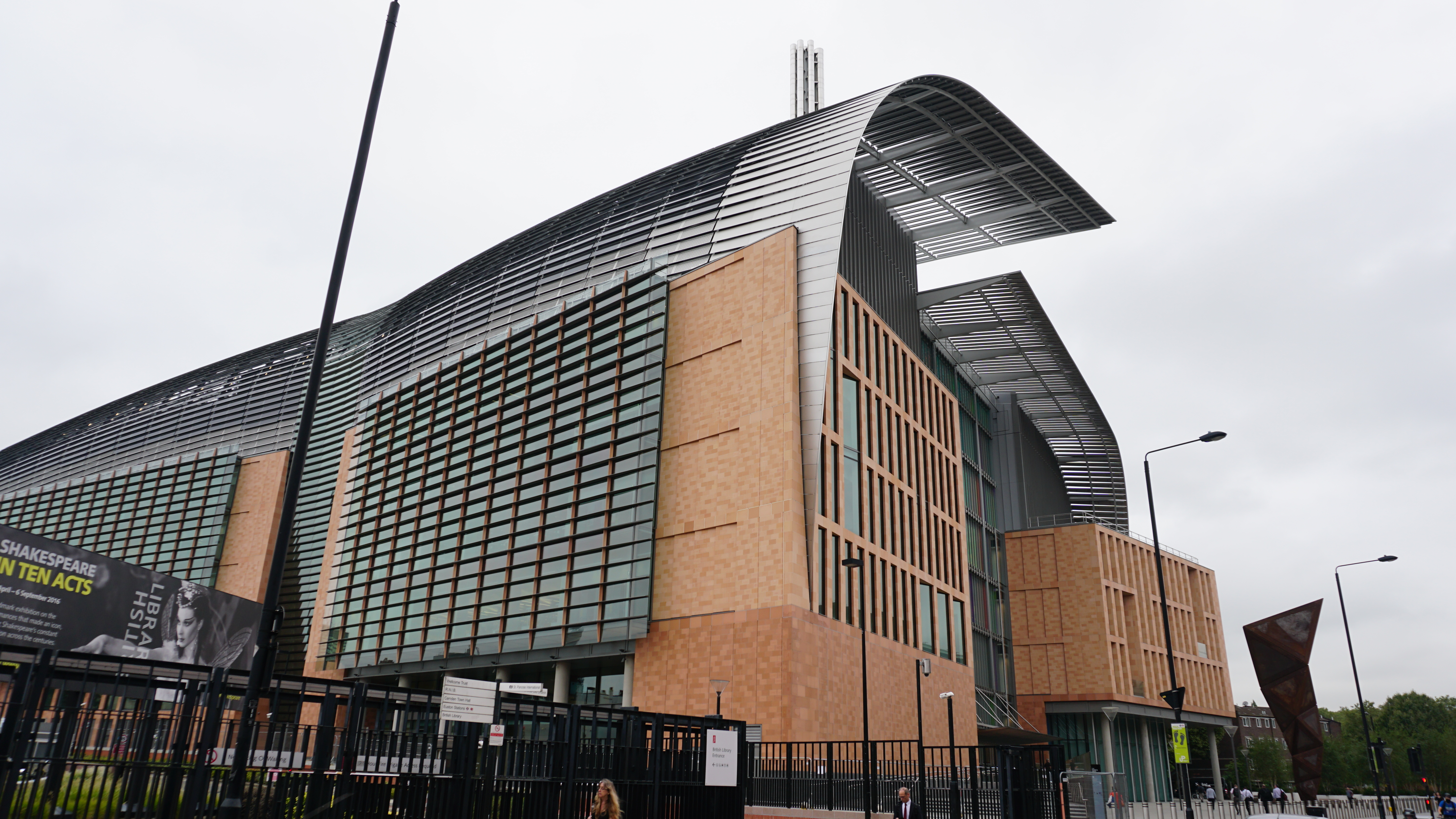
Francis Crick Institute

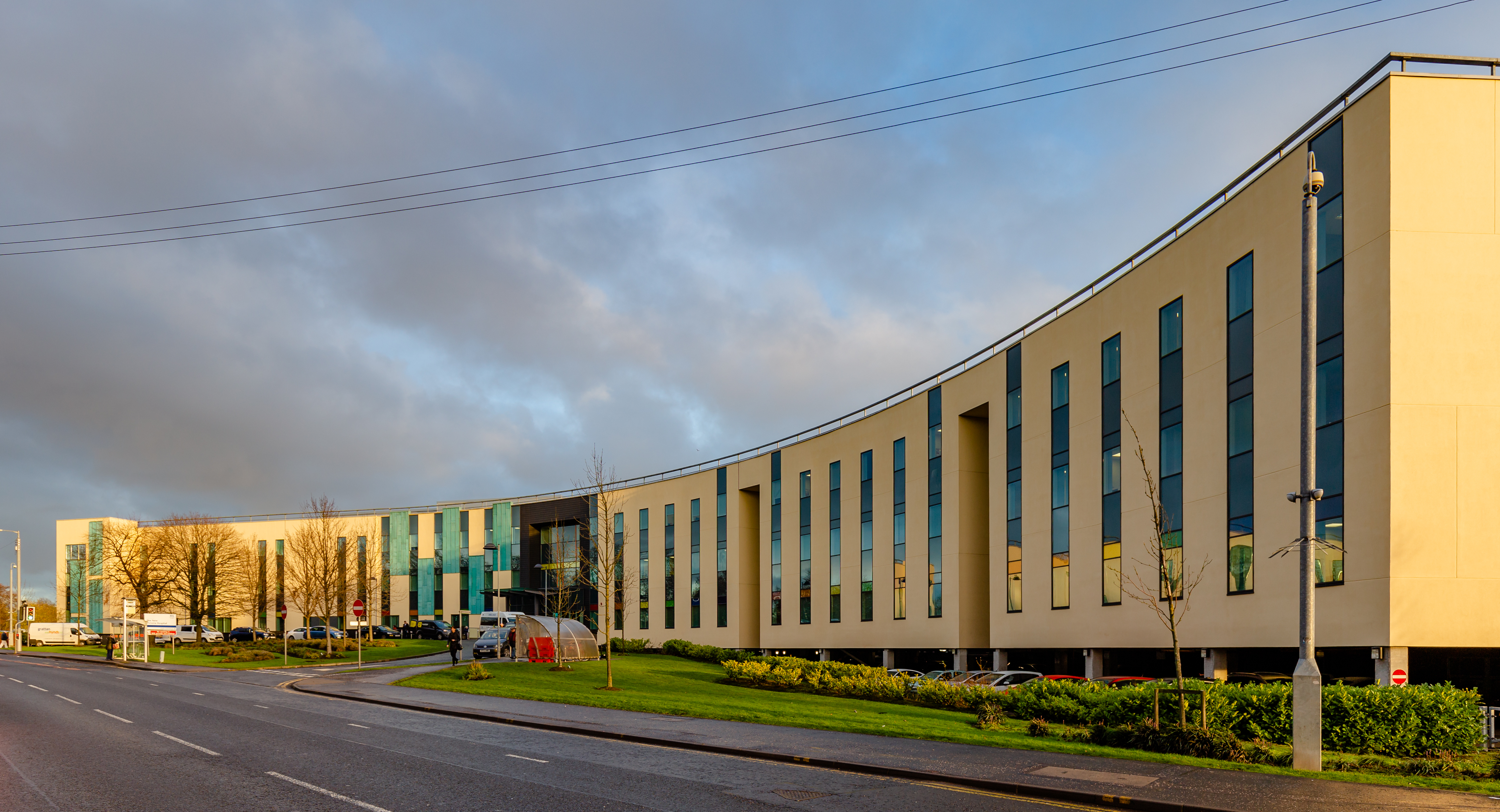
New Victoria Hospital

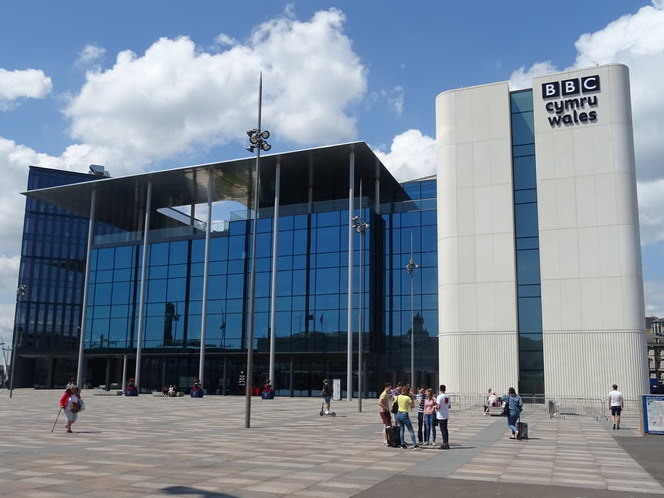
BBC Cymru Wales

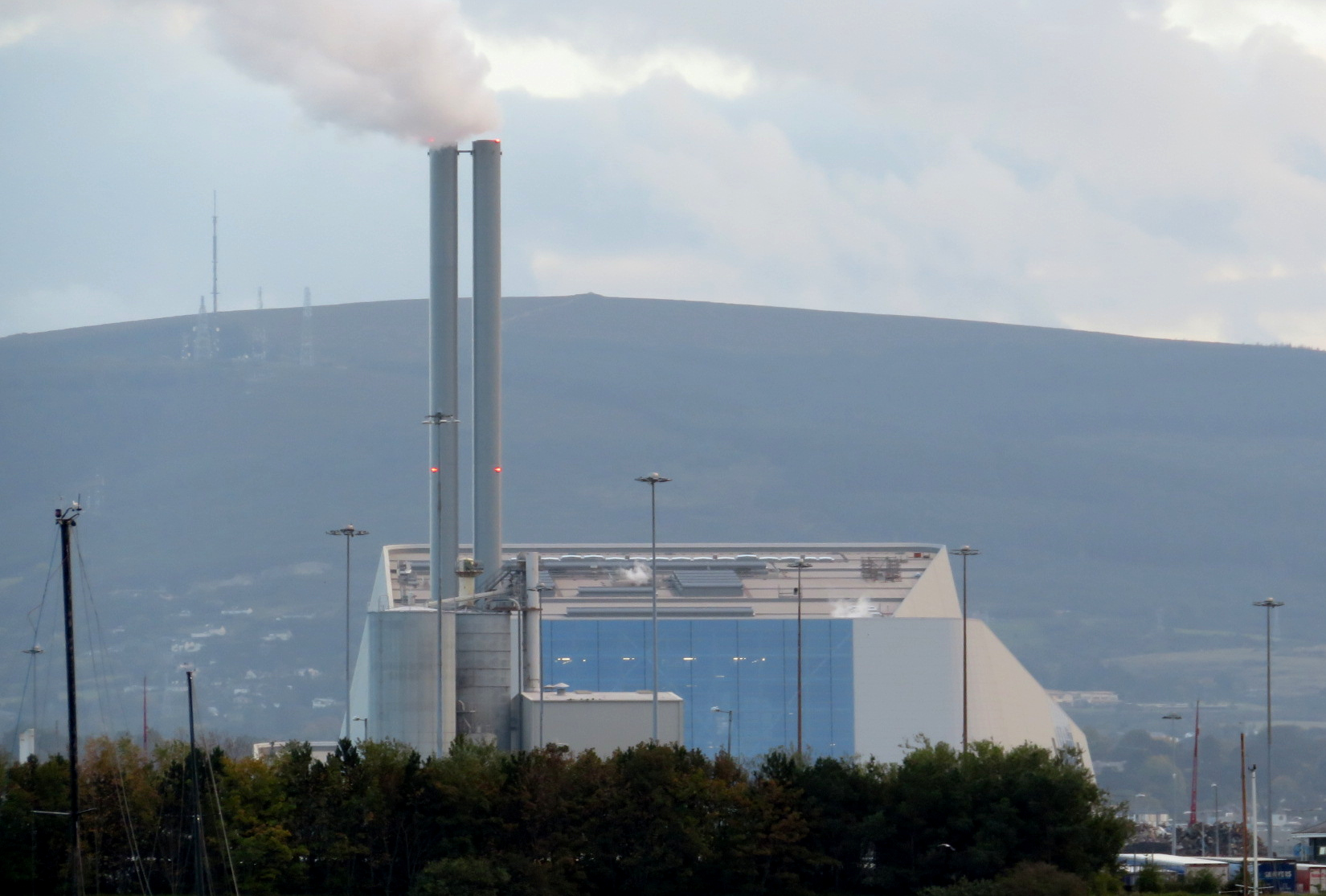
Dublin Waste-to-Energy Facility

Philharmonie de Paris

=== Other ===
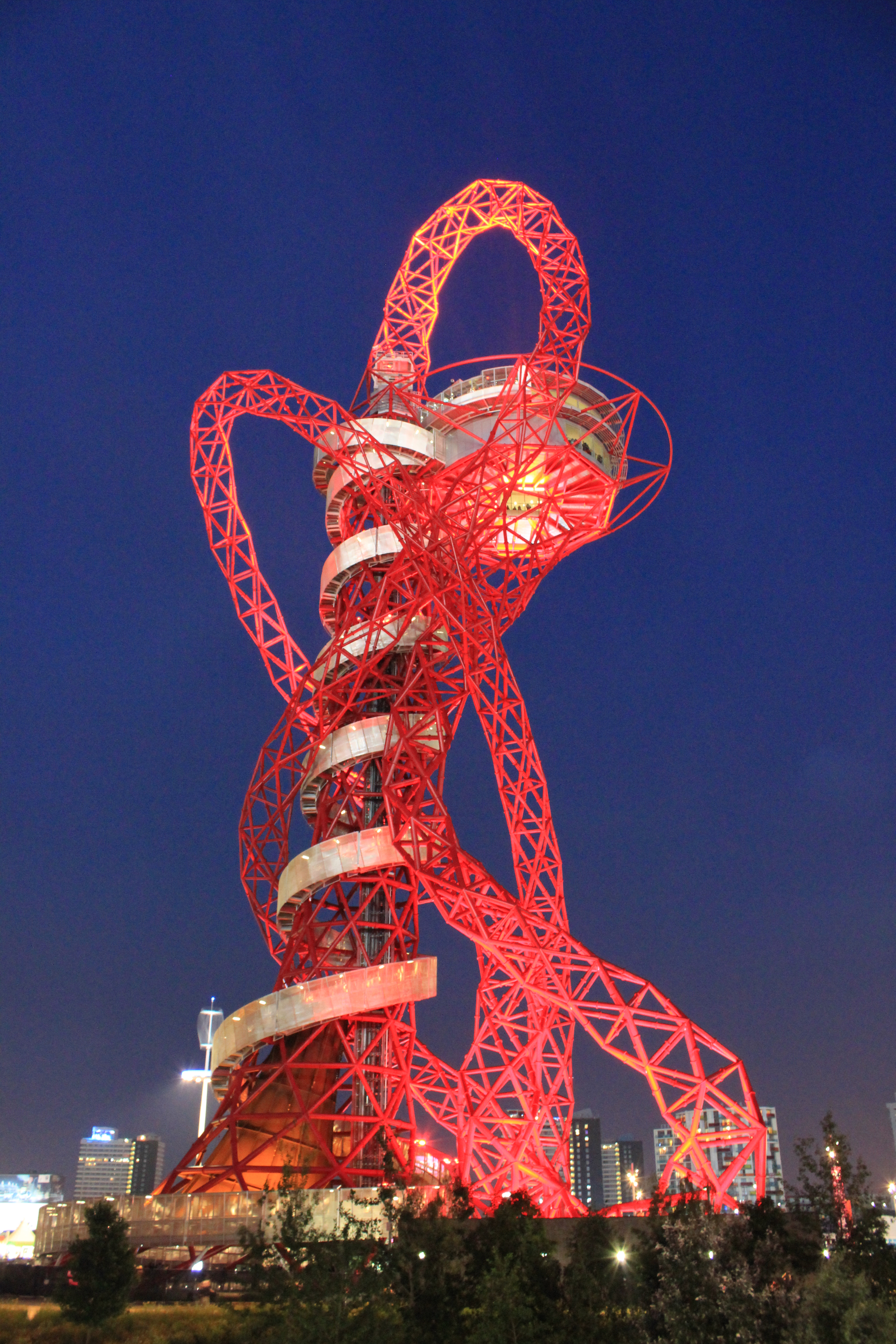
ArcelorMittal Orbit

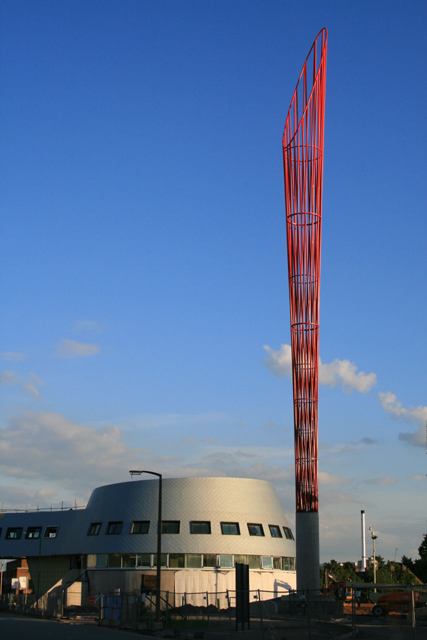
Aspire, Nottingham

== Controversies ==
=== Job losses ===
In April 2025, Diana Armstrong, Member of the Legislative Assembly for Fermanagh and South Tyrone expressed concern about job losses at Severfield's Ballinamallard business. After a profit warning, Severfield's CEO had also agreed to leave the company.

=== Bridge welding ===
In 2024, Severfield made provisions of £20.4 million for potential remediation work on at least 12 bridges manufactured for HS2 and National Highways. Affected structures included three completed HS2 bridges and the 3,400 tonnes (3,300 long tons) Allerdene Bridge over the East Coast Mainline in Gateshead. National Highways imposed traffic restrictions and lane closures on a section of the A1 until the weld defects had been resolved, and indicated the bridges' lives could be reduced. An industry media report suggested approach viaducts to Birmingham Curzon Street railway station were affected and that the issue relates to butt welds in weathering steel.

=== Site falls ===
In 2021, a steel erector employed by Severfield fell down a staircase at Google's Kings Cross site and was unfit to work for six days. Severfield suspected fraud and summarily dismissed him, but an Employment Tribunal determined the incident occurred; that the employee was unfairly dismissed, and awarded £2,721 in compensation. There was no order for payment in lieu of notice because, post dismissal, the erector took immediate, better remunerated employment elsewhere.

In 2002, a 29 year old steel fixer, working in Waltham Abbey for Severfield's Steelcraft Erection Services Ltd, fell from a new Sainsbury's distribution centre and suffered spinal injuries; broken ribs, and a punctured lung.

=== Hazardous fumes ===
In March 2020, Severfield was served a Health and Safety Executive Improvement Notice because of hazardous welding fumes at its Lostock works. The fault was corrected by April 2020.

=== Late payment ===
In July 2019, subsidiary Severfield Design and Build Ltd was suspended from the UK Government's Prompt Payment Code for failing to pay suppliers on time. The firm submitted an action plan to the Chartered Institute of Credit Management and was reinstated by November 2019.

=== Leadenhall Tower ===
During 2013, Severfield acknowledged substantial contractual losses in relation to Leadenhall Tower in the City of London. This prompted a major restructuring of the business; departure of the chief executive, and a £45m rights issue. Severfield's 2012 accounts included a £9.9 million charge for losses at Leadenhall Tower, plus a further £10.2 million on other delinquent contracts.

In 2014, two embrittled bolts broke and fell from Leadenhall Tower. Another snapped in 2015. Severfield announced an anticipated £6 million charge for bolt remediation works in 2015, and final settlement in 2019. Leeds based Andrews Fasteners Ltd, who went into administration, supplied the 3,000 defective 'megabolts', each the size of a human arm. A majority were replaced. Severfield had not used the bolts before and its chief executive commented that it would be unlikely to do so in the future.

During 2017 redevelopment of nearby 22 Bishopsgate, a suspended girder struck Leadenhall Tower. Severfield was the steel frame subcontractor to Multiplex's Bishopsgate site. Nobody was hurt.

=== White finger ===
In November 2017, Severfield was served a Health and Safety Executive Improvement Notice because of tools causing excessive hand arm vibrations at its Dalton facility. New working practices were applied by March 2018.

In 2011, a plater at the site had suffered permanent damage to his hands caused by vibrating tools provided by the firm. He developed white finger.

=== Forklift fatality ===
In 2016, the Health and Safety Executive fined Severfield £135,000, plus £46,020 costs, following a 2013 incident when a 27 year old was fatally crushed at its Dalton site. After moving welding wire, he had been reversing a forklift at speed and it overturned. Judge Anthony Briggs accepted Severfield had sought to ensure the safety of its staff but said it had been blind to enforcing the use of seat belts on forklift trucks. After the accident, £9,000 was raised for the Yorkshire Air Ambulance.

=== Carrington Power Station ===
In 2013, Severfield contracted with the Duro Felguera group to provide steelwork for the new Carrington Power Station. Duro Felguera's UK subsidiary refused to pay a December 2014 stage payment. Severfield obtained adjudication under the Housing Grants, Construction and Regeneration Act 1996 for £2,470,231.97, and then sought summary judgement from the High Court of Justice to enforce payment for a reduced amount of £1,445,495.78. Judge Stuart-Smith refused because part of the sum related to a power plant and was therefore excluded from the 1996 Act, and the adjudicator's jurisdiction. Duro Felguera argued it was in fact owed money by Severfield because of overpayments.

Severfield finally obtained a judgement from Mr Justice Coulson in 2017 for £2,774,077.91 (or £1,760,480.27 up to 2014) but by then Duro Felguera UK Ltd had entered liquidation and recovery was limited to what Duro Felguera in Spain could be obliged to pay under a parent company guarantee for the period up to 2014.

=== Faulty plate clamp ===
In 2012, Severfield settled the claim from a welder who had been moving steelwork with a crane and faulty plate clamp. A 10 foot (3.0 m) long, and 2 foot (0.61 m) wide, beam fell and crushed his foot.

=== Discrimination by association ===
In 2011, Severfield reduced the number of welders at its Sherburn site by selectively not renewing the contract of an employee who was caring for his disabled wife. He claimed discrimination by association. Severfield could not satisfy the employment tribunal there was any other reason for the dismissal and the welder was awarded £10,500 compensation with a recommendation he should be re-employed.

=== Clyde Arc Bridge ===
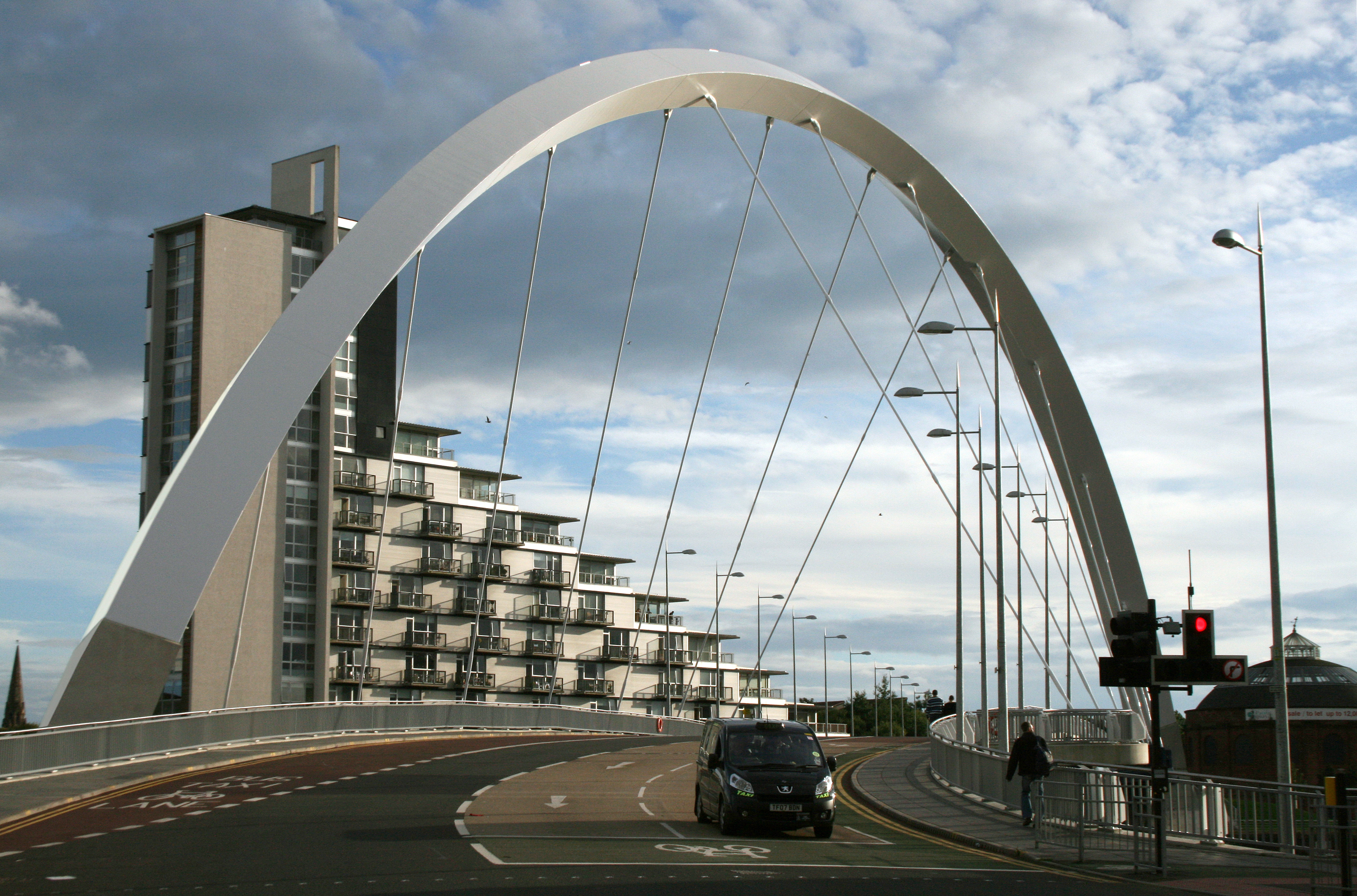
Clyde Arc Bridge

Severfield subsidiary Watson Steel Structures Ltd fabricated the Clyde Arc Bridge in 2007. It had to be closed in 2008 because a clevis connector failed and a 35 metres (110 ft) long tension bar fell onto the carriageway. Another clevis was found to be cracked and it was decided to replace all 14 tension bars in the structure. Watson Steel Structures Ltd claimed £1.8 million from Macalloy, the clevis supplier, alleging its product was faulty. Macalloy denied the claim and countered Watson Steel Structures Ltd had only specified minimum yield stress for the components.

=== Founder transactions ===
In 2001, directors of the company, including John Severs, purchased its headquarters property for £14 million. In 2007, the company bought it back again for £23.5 million. Both transactions were endorsed by the independent directors.

Shareholders rebelled against a 2007 payment of £1.6 million to retiring managing director, John Severs. They refused to pass a resolution at AGM to authorise the payment which had already been made.

=== Epoxy resin paint ===
In 2005 Severfield dismissed a painter, at its newly acquired Sherburn site, who suffered allergic industrial contact dermatitis following exposure to epoxy resin paint. He claimed compensation. Severfield initially denied, but then accepted responsibility just before the 2007 High Court hearing. Mr Recorder Salter went on to award the painter £113,168.15 damages including £50,000 for loss of future earnings. The firm appealed but in 2008, Lord Justice Keene's judgement rejected its arguments and increased the award for future earnings loss to £90,000.

=== Roof leaks ===
In 1989, a subsidiary of Georg Fischer AG built a distribution warehouse near Coventry. The shallow pitch roof leaked, exacerbated by deflection of supporting steelwork. It sued the builders and designer. Severfield-Reeve plc was the steelwork subcontractor and met specifications supplied to it by the designer. In 1994, Severfield-Reeve plc agreed to pay £175,000 to the building owner in return for an indemnity against all parties in the matter.

In 2009, Severfield became third party in a claim relating to the leaking roof at an Albert Bartlett potato processing plant in Airdrie constructed by its subsidiary Atlas Ward Structures. Severfield agreed joint liability with the building's main contractors. Lord Menzies in the Outer House of the Court of Session was asked to choose between remediation options for the Airdrie premises, the alternatives differing in cost and quantum of damages. He drew attention to the similar decision that had faced Judge Hicks in the Fischer warehouse case.

In 2011, the Daily Mirror alleged the retractable roof over Wimbledon Centre Court leaked during a quarter final tennis match. Severfield completed the 3,000 ton moving roof in 2009. The All England Club stated the leaks were in the permanent roof, not the mobile section, and were "part of the normal drainage process".

== See also ==
- British Constructional Steelwork Association
- Cleveland Bridge & Engineering Company
- William Hare Group
- Rowecord Engineering
