= Parent company guarantee =

A parent company guarantee (PCG) is a guarantee by a parent company of a contractor’s performance under its contract with its client, where the contractor is a subsidiary of the parent company.

It is mandatory for all the companies to mention about the guarantees granted as a note in their accounts because it is a risk for the company. The parent/holding company can refuse to renew the guarantee.
