= 1982 New Year Honours =

British royal recognitions

The New Year Honours 1982 were appointments by most of the Commonwealth realms of Queen Elizabeth II to various orders and honours to reward and highlight good works by citizens of those countries, and honorary ones to citizens of other countries. They were announced in The London Gazette on 31 December 1981 to celebrate the year passed and mark the beginning of 1982.

The recipients of honours are displayed here as they were styled before their new honour, and arranged by honour, with classes (Knight, Knight Grand Cross, etc.) and then divisions (Military, Civil, etc.) as appropriate.

== United Kingdom and Commonwealth ==
=== Life Peer ===
Barons

- Sir Ian Powell Bancroft, GCB. Lately Head of the Home Civil Service.
- Sir William Nicholas Cayzer, Bt., Chairman, British & Commonwealth Shipping Co. Ltd.
- Sir Charles Forte. Executive Chairman, Trust-Houses Forte Ltd.
- Sir Crawford Murray MacLehose, GBE, KCMG, KCVO. Governor and Commander-in-Chief, Hong Kong.

=== Privy Counsellor ===
- The Honourable Douglas Richard Hurd, CBE, MP. Minister of State, Foreign and Commonwealth Office. Member of Parliament for Mid-Oxfordshire.
- Timothy Hugh Francis Raison, MP. Minister of State, Home Office. Member of Parliament for Aylesbury.

=== Knight Bachelor ===
- George Thomas Thalben-Ball, CBE. For services to music.
- Lawrence Arthur Barratt, Chairman and Managing Director, Barratt Developments plc.
- James Arnold Stacey Cleminson, MC, Chairman, Reckitt & Colman plc.
- James Macdonald Cobban, CBE, TD, DL. For Public Service.
- Douglas Peter Grossman, TD, DL. For Political and Public Service in Eastern England.
- Peter Frank Hannibal Emery, MP. For Political and Public Service.
- Anthony Fell, MP. For Political and Public Service.
- Basil Mortimer Lindsay-Fynn. For Political and Public Service in London.
- Victor Henry Goodhew, MP. For Political and Public Service.
- Nicholas Proctor Goodison, Chairman, The Stock Exchange.
- James Learmonth Gowans, CBE, Secretary, Medical Research Council.
- John Currie Gunn, CBE, Cargill Professor of Natural Philosophy, University of Glasgow.
- Professor Douglas Chalmers Hague, CBE. For Political and Public Service.
- John Charles Hermon, OBE, Chief Constable, Royal Ulster Constabulary.
- George Trevor Holdsworth, Chairman, Guest, Keen and Nettlefolds Ltd.
- Robert Yewdall Jennings, QC, lately Whewell Professor of International Law, University of Cambridge.
- Jack Lewis, Professor of Inorganic Chemistry, University of Cambridge.
- Charles Ernest O'Halloran, Convener, Strathclyde Regional Council.
- Evelyn Charles Sackville Russell, Chief Metropolitan Magistrate.
- Peter Saunders. For services to the Theatre.
- Leonard Herbert Smith, CBE. For Political and Public Service.
- Roy Colin Strong, Director, Victoria and Albert Museum.
- Adrian Christopher Swire, AE. For services to the shipping industry.
- George Walter Roberts Terry, CBE, QPM, Chief Constable, Sussex Police.
- John Peter Mills Tizard, Professor of Paediatrics, University of Oxford.
- Alan Marshall Muir Wood, Senior Partner, Sir William Halcrow and Partners.

Diplomatic Service and Overseas List

- The Honourable James Rufus Astwood, Chief Justice of Bermuda.

Australian States

State of Victoria

- The Honourable John Gerald Norris, ED, QC, For service to the law.
- Thomas Lindsay North. For service to the retail industry.

State of Queensland

- Archibald Archer, CMG. For services to primary industries, government and the community.

State of South Australia

- Eric Emil von Schramek. For services to architecture and the community.

State of Western Australia

- Kenneth Joseph Townsing, CMG, ISO. For public service and service to education.

=== Order of the Bath ===
==== Knight Grand Cross of the Order of the Bath (GCB) ====
Military Division

- General Sir Richard Worsley, KCB, OBE, (240132), late The Royal Dragoons (1st Dragoons).

==== Knight Commander of the Order of the Bath (KCB) ====
Military Division

Army

- Lieutenant General Maurice Robert Johnston, OBE, (403506), late 1st The Queen's Dragoon Guards.

Royal Air Force

- Air Marshal John Robson Rogers, CBE.

Civil Division

- William Ewart Bell, CB, Head of Northern Ireland Civil Service.
- Cecil Montacute Clothier, QC, Parliamentary Commissioner for Administration, and Health Service Commissioner for England, Wales and Scotland.

==== Companion of the Order of the Bath (CB) ====
Military Division

Royal Navy

- Rear Admiral George Maxted Kenneth Brewer.
- Commandant Elizabeth Sara Anne Craig-McFeely, ADC, Women's Royal Naval Service.
- Rear Admiral Peter Gerald Hammersley, OBE.
- Major General John Jeremy Moore, OBE, Royal Marines.

Army

- Major General Esmond John Bowen, QHDS, (298448), late Royal Army Dental Corps.
- Major General James Brown (397824), late Royal Army Ordnance Corps.
- Major General Charles Richard Huxtable, CBE, (420858), late The Duke of Wellington's Regiment (West Riding).
- Major General Peter Frank Aubrey Sibbald, OBE, (393285), Colonel Commandant The Light Division.
- Major General John Aubrey Stephenson, OBE, (400075), late Royal Regiment of Artillery.

Royal Air Force

- Air Vice-Marshal Bertrand Brownlow, OBE, AFC.
- Air Vice-Marshal Neville Stanley Howlett.
- Air Vice-Marshal Tom Birkett Stephenson.
- Air Commodore Helen Ferguson Renton, ADC, Women's Royal Air Force.

Civil Division

- Alan Marshall Bailey, Deputy Secretary, Cabinet Office.
- John Bilsland Bailey, Deputy Treasury Solicitor, Office of HM Procurator General and Treasury Solicitor.
- Peter Robert Barnes, Deputy Director of Public Prosecutions.
- Kenneth Percy Bloomfield, Permanent Secretary, Department of Commerce for Northern Ireland.
- Robert Stanley Boyd, Solicitor, Board of Inland Revenue.
- John Desmond Bryars, Deputy Secretary, Ministry of Defence.
- John Delafons, Deputy Secretary, Department of the Environment.
- Gordon William Fowler, Under Secretary, Home Office
- Ronald Gausden, lately HM Chief Inspector of Nuclear Installations, Department of Employment.
- John Edgar Hansford, Under Secretary, HM Treasury.
- Henry Knorpel, Solicitor, Department of Health and Social Security.
- John Alexander Marshall, Deputy Secretary, Northern Ireland Office.
- Wilfred Meakin, Managing Director, Royal Ordnance Factories, Ministry of Defence.
- Timothy Edward Nodder, Deputy Secretary, Department of Health and Social Security.
- Douglas Boucher Smith, Deputy Secretary, Department of Employment.
- Edward John Gregg Smith, Deputy Secretary, Ministry of Agriculture, Fisheries and Food.
- Walter Purvis Smith, OBE, Director General, Ordnance Survey.
- Derek John Wakefield, Foreign and Commonwealth Office.
- Ernest John David Warne, Deputy Director General, Office of Fair Trading.

Australian States

State of Victoria

- Kenneth David Green, OBE, ED. For public service.

=== Order of Saint Michael and Saint George ===
==== Knight Grand Cross of the Order of St Michael and St George (GCMG) ====
Diplomatic Service and Overseas List

- Sir Reginald Hibbert, KCMG, HM Ambassador, Paris.
- Sir Anthony Parsons, KCMG, MVO, MC, United Kingdom Permanent Representative to the United Nations, New York.

==== Knight Commander of the Order of St Michael and St George (KCMG) ====
Diplomatic Service and Overseas List

- John Charles Burgh, CB, Director-General, British Council.
- Major John Emsley Fretwell, CMG, lately Minister, H.M. Embassy, Washington.
- Iain Johnstone Macbeth Sutherland, CMG, H.M. Ambassador, Athens.

Australian States

State of Victoria

- The Honourable Rupert James Hamer, ED. For political and public service.

==== Companion of the Order of St Michael and St George (CMG) ====
- Patrick Craigmile Duff, Assistant Secretary, Overseas Development Administration.
- John Keith Lumley Thompson, MBE, TD, Counsellor (Science and Technology), HM Embassy, Washington.

Diplomatic Service and Overseas List

- Michael O'Donel Bjarne Alexander, HM Ambassador-designate, Vienna.
- Stephen Jeremy Barrett, lately Head of British Interests Section, Royal Swedish Embassy, Tehran.
- Christopher Keith Curwen, Foreign and Commonwealth Office.
- Timothy Lewis Achilles Daunt, Foreign and Commonwealth Office.
- Patrick Morris Coventry Denby, lately Assistant Director-General, International Labour Organization, Geneva.
- William Norman Hillier-Fry, British, High Commissioner, Kampala.
- Wilfred Jones, British High Commissioner, Gaborone.
- Robin John Taylor McLaren, Political Adviser, Hong Kong.
- The Honourable Humphrey John Hamilton Maud, Minister, HM Embassy, Madrid.
- John Albert Leigh Morgan, HM Ambassador, Seoul.
- James Ernest Reeve, HM Consul-General, Milan.
- Derek Tonkin, HM Ambassador, Hanoi.
- Ian Sinclair Winchester, Minister-designate, HM Embassy, Jedda.

Australian States

State of Queensland

- Roy Deicke. For service to the sugar industry.

State of Western Australia

- Leslie Edward Stephenson McCarrey, Permanent Head of the Treasury Department.

=== Royal Victorian Order ===
==== Dame Commander of the Royal Victorian Order (DCVO) ====
- Alice Anne Wall, CVO.

==== Knight Commander of the Royal Victorian Order (KCVO) ====
- William Frederick Payne Heseltine, CB, CVO.
- Captain Miles Buckley Wingate.

==== Commander of the Royal Victorian Order (CVO) ====
- Lieutenant Colonel Rodney Onslow Dennys, MVO, OBE.
- James George Eve.
- Professor Kenneth Gordon Lowe.
- Maurice Mendoza.

==== Member of the Royal Victorian Order (MVO) ====
At this time the two lowest classes of the Royal Victorian Order were "Member (fourth class)" and "Member (fifth class)", both with post-nominal letters MVO. "Member (fourth class)" was renamed "Lieutenant" (LVO) from the 1985 New Year Honours onwards.

Fourth Class

- Surgeon Captain Norman James Blacklock, OBE, Royal Navy (Retired).
- Squadron Leader David Hurley, AFC, Royal Air Force.
- Harry Dockrill Jones, MVO.
- The Reverend John Francis Morgan Llewellyn.
- Captain Robin Stafford Markes, Royal Navy.
- Dolores Malita De Rohan Monreal, MVO, MBE.
- Captain Michael Antony Claes Moore, Royal Navy.
- Squadron Leader David John Rowe, Royal Air Force.
- George Drewry Squibb, QC.

Fifth Class

- Jacquetta Anne Adams.
- Vivien Irene Joy Clifford.
- Elizabeth Hazel Cuthbert.
- Dorothy Joan Ferme.
- George Black Lowe.
- Superintendent Paul Nicholas Officer, Metropolitan Police.
- Lieutenant Commander Philip Anthony Shaw, Royal Navy.

==== Medal of the Royal Victorian Order (RVM) ====
In Gold

- William Baker, RVM.
- William John Prater, RVM.

In Silver

- Police Constable Michael Charles Allen, Metropolitan Police.
- Derek Charles Chappell.
- Harry Crago.
- F8077616 Sergeant Richard Ian Dawling, Royal Air Force.
- Mary Doran.
- A8007964 Sergeant Paul Ronald George Howarth, Royal Air Force.
- Leading Steward David George Martin, L958329Q.
- Noel McCombie.
- Police Constable Donald Royston Murphy, Metropolitan Police.
- Charles John Tack.

=== Order of the British Empire ===
==== Knight Grand Cross of the Order of the British Empire (GBE) ====
Military Division

- Admiral Sir Anthony Morton, KCB.
- General Sir Anthony Farrar-Hockley, KCB, DSO, MBE, MC, ADC Gen., (251309), Colonel The Gloucestershire Regiment, Colonel Commandant The Parachute Regiment.

Civil Division

- Sir Francis Aimé Vallat, KCMG, lately Member of the International Law Commission.

==== Dame Commander of the Order of the British Empire (DBE) ====
Civil Division

- Elisabeth Jean Frink, CBE, Sculptor.
- Catherine Mary Hall, CBE, General Secretary, Royal College of Nursing of the United Kingdom.
- Ida Felicity Ann Yonge, MBE. For Political Service.

==== Knight Commander of the Order of the British Empire (KBE) ====
Military Division

- Surgeon Vice Admiral John Albert Bews Harrison, QHP.
- Air Marshal Arnold Alec Morris, CB, Royal Air Force.

Civil Division

- The Reverend William Owen Chadwick, Regius Professor of Modern History, University of Cambridge. President of the British Academy.
- The Honourable Thomas Galloway Dunlop Galbraith, MP. For Political and Public Service.

Diplomatic Service and Overseas List

- John Patrick Ivan Hennessy, CMG, OBE, lately Governor and Commander-in-Chief, Belize.

Australian States

State of Western Australia

- The Honourable Frederick Charles Chaney, CBE, AFC, Lord Mayor of Perth.

==== Commander of the Order of the British Empire (CBE) ====
Military Division

Royal Navy

- Surgeon Rear Admiral Francis Michael Kinsman, OBE, QHP.
- Captain Richard Edgar Lambert.
- Captain Michael Cecil Maurice Mansergh.
- Captain Michael L'Estrange Tudor-Craig, ADC.

Army

- Brigadier David John Atkinson, MBE, (433287), late Royal Regiment of Artillery.
- Brigadier Richard Anthony Clay, OBE, (411915), late Royal Regiment of Artillery.
- Colonel Ian Campbell Crawford (484427), late Royal Army Medical Corps.
- Colonel Christopher John Lee (426937), late The Royal Regiment of Wales (24th/41st Foot).
- Colonel Robert Vaughan Ockenden, OBE, (430402), late Royal Tank Regiment.
- Brigadier (Local Major General) Charles Patrick Ralph Palmer, OBE, (430407), late The Argyll and Sutherland Highlanders (Princess Louise's).
- Colonel (Local Brigadier) Derek Charles Wilkins, TD, (478736), late Royal Army Medical Corps, Territorial Army.

Royal Air Force

- Air Commodore Albert Daniel Arthur Honley, AFC.
- Group Captain John Hulme Harris.
- Group Captain Barry Higgs.
- Group Captain Peter Philip Wallington Taylor, AFC.

Civil Division

- Raymon Harry Anning, QPM, HM Inspector of Constabulary.
- Barbara Mary Ansell. For services to Rheumatology.
- John Arbuckle, OBE, Chairman of Board of Governors, Scottish Crop Research Institute.
- Simon Claude Ashton. For Political Service in London.
- Donald Geoffrey Avery, Deputy Managing Director, British Nuclear Fuels Ltd.
- Barclay James Bennett, lately Deputy Director, Scottish Courts Administration.
- Raymond John Bleasdale, Director of Estates and Environment, Scottish Development Agency.
- Timothy Richard Vincent Bolland, Chairman, Kent Area Health Authority.
- Richard Maddock Brew, Member, Greater London Council.
- Peter Neil Brook, lately Principal, College of Estate Management, Reading.
- Bernard Joseph Brown, Chief Commoner, City of London.
- David John Bowes Brown, Managing Director, D.J.B. Engineering Ltd. For services to Export.
- John Brown, lately Chairman of Engineering Board, Science and Engineering Research Council.
- Squadron Leader Kenneth Francis MacKay Bush. For Political and Public Service in Eastern England.
- Philip David Carter, Managing Director, Littlewoods Organisation Ltd.
- Leonard Joseph John Clark. For services to conservation.
- Bertram Cohen, Nuffield Professor of Dental Science, Royal College of Surgeons of England.
- Raymond Colegate, Group Director, Economic Services, Civil Aviation Authority.
- Reuben Conrad, lately Member, Medical Research Council Applied Psychology Unit.
- Dorothy Rosemary Anna Cooper, Assistant Secretary, Board of Customs and Excise.
- Charles Raymond Cory, Chairman, South Glamorgan Area Health Authority.
- Ian Dewar Coutts, Chairman, Finance Committee, Association of County Councils.
- Eileen Rosemary Cowley. For Political and Public Service in South Eastern England.
- Oliver Jasper Cox, Architect, Shankland/Cox Partnership.
- Meredith Davies (Albert Meredith Davies). For services to music.
- Anthony Peter de Boer, Member, National Bus Company.
- Hugh Edward de Wardener, MBE, Professor of Medicine, Charing Cross Hospital Medical School, University of London.
- Donald Roy Donaldson, MVO, AFC, lately Chairman, Baltic Exchange.
- Sir William Stratford Dugdale, Bt., MC, DL, Chairman, Severn Trent Water Authority.
- Michael Elliott, Deputy Director and Head of Insecticides and Fungicides Department, Rothamsted Experimental Station, Harpenden.
- Arnold Elton. For Political and Public Service.
- James Alan Fowles, Executive Director, Middle Band, Department of Transport.
- Francis Ross Gibb, Joint Managing Director, Taylor Woodrow Construction Limited.
- Professor Francis John Gillingham, MBE, President, Royal College of Surgeons of Edinburgh.
- Peter Gordon Gower. For Political Service.
- John Michael Wallace-Hadrill, Chichele Professor of Modern History, University of Oxford.
- Alexander Harbinson, Chairman, Northern Ireland Staffs Council for the Health and Social Services.
- Patrick Kennard Harrison, Secretary, Royal Institute of British Architects.
- Professor Stephen William Hawking. For services to astronomical research.
- Anthony Holmes, Foreign and Commonwealth Office.
- James Caldwell Houston, Dean of the Medical and Dental Schools, Guy's Hospital.
- Alan Thomas Howarth. For Political Service.
- Philip Arthur Booley Hughes, Chairman, Logica Holdings. For services to Export.
- Ian Sutherland Irwin, Deputy Chairman and Managing Director, Scottish Transport Group.
- Leslie Edwin Elloway Jeanes, Chief of Public Relations, Ministry of Defence.
- Major Maurice Jewell, TD. For Political Service in the West Midlands.
- Leslie Charles Kemp, Chairman, Construction Industry Training Board.
- Thomas Sheldon Kilpatrick, Chairman, Foundries Economic Development Committee.
- Ronald Luke Latham, Directing Grade A, Ministry of Defence.
- Antony Maltravers Legge, lately Editor, Farmers Weekly.
- Bryan Charles Lindley, Director of Technology, Dunlop Limited.
- Robert Cowburn Livesey, Director and Secretary, National Ports Council.
- Professor Charles Ronald Lowe, Chairman, Industrial Injuries Advisory Council.
- William McCamley, Chief Industrial Pollution Inspector, Scottish Development Department.
- George Douglas Macaulay, Director-General of Printing, HM Stationery Office.
- Eric Wallace McDowell, Chairman, Industries Development Advisory Committee, Northern Ireland.
- John McKee, OBE. For Political and Public Service in Northern England.
- John Stuart Maclure, Editor, The Times Educational Supplement.
- James Alexander Strachan McPherson. For Political and Public Service in Scotland.
- John Manduell, Principal, Royal Northern College of Music.
- Peggy Joyce Mardell, Regional Nursing Officer, North West Thames Regional Health Authority.
- Margaret Joan Marshall, lately Chief Inspector of Schools, Department of Education and Science.
- Captain Peter Francis Mason, Elder Brother and Board Member, Trinity House.
- Charles Robert Owen Medley, Painter and Theatrical Designer.
- Denys Gordon Milne, lately Chief Executive, BP Oil Ltd.
- Derek James Minchin, Assistant Secretary, Department of Industry.
- Thomas Morgan, Lord Provost of the City of Edinburgh.
- Sylvia Margaret Murray. For Political and Public Service in Northern England.
- Reginald Milton Older, Farmer, Ashford, Kent.
- Peter Francis Orchard, Chief Executive, The De La Rue Company plc. For services to Export.
- Andrew Pares, MBE. For Political and Public Service in London.
- Ian Michael Scott Park, lately President, Law Society of Scotland.
- Francis David Penny, Managing Director, Yarrow & Company Ltd.
- Anthony William Pragnell, OBE, DFC, Deputy Director General, Independent Broadcasting Authority.
- Roy Douglas Price, County Education Officer, Dorset.
- Harry Purcell, Chairman, West Mercia Police Authority.
- Richard Ellis Meuric Rees, Farmer, Tywyn, Gwynedd.
- Richard Michael Ringwald, Chairman, Laporte Industries (Holdings) Ltd.
- Alan Robertson, Main Board Director, Imperial Chemical Industries plc.
- Alan John Ross, Author, Publisher and Journalist.
- The Reverend David Syme Russell, General Secretary, Baptist Union of Great Britain and Ireland.
- Thomas Rutherford, Chairman, North Eastern Electricity Board, and Member, Electricity Council.
- Professor Wilfred Leonard Saunders, Director, Department of Information Studies, University of Sheffield.
- Robert Scholey, Deputy Chairman, British Steel Corporation.
- Patricia Dorothy Mary Batty Shaw, lately National Chairman, National Federation of Women's Institutes.
- Francis Edwin Showering, Chairman, SVPW Division, Allied Lyons plc.
- Alison Cheveley Shrubsole, Principal, Homerton College, Cambridge.
- Bryan Crossley Smith, Member for Marketing, British Gas Corporation.
- John Wilson Smith, Chairman, Liverpool Football Club.
- Warwick Nevison Squire, Director, Dowty Group plc, and Managing Director, Dowty Aerospace and Defence Division. For services to Export.
- Bernard Arthur Stapleton, OBE, MC, TD, Deputy Chairman, Navy, Army and Air Force Institutes.
- Edgar Kendall Taylor, Pianist.
- William Leonard Taylor, lately Chairman, Scottish Special Housing Association.
- Ian Douglas Thomson, Senior Principal Inspector of Taxes, Board of Inland Revenue.
- Barry Maurice Waller Trapnell, DL, Headmaster, Oundle School, Northamptonshire.
- John Reginald Watts, Principal Actuary, Government Actuary's Department.
- Ivan Ray Yates, Director of Engineering and Project Assessment, Aircraft Group Headquarters, British Aerospace plc. For services to Export.

Diplomatic Service and Overseas List

- Henry Ching, Deputy Financial Secretary, Hong Kong.
- Charles Henry Godden, HM Commissioner, Anguilla.
- Ernest Irfon Lee, OBE, Commissioner of Narcotics, Hong Kong.
- Tak Shing Lo, OBE. For public services in Hong Kong.
- Dr. Thomas James Rew Macara, OBE. For services to the British community in Argentina.
- Aurelius Peter Montegriffo, OBE. For public services in Gibraltar.
- Alan James Scott, Secretary for Information, Hong Kong.
- Claude Harold Whistler, OBE, lately British Council Representative, Belgium.
- Dr. Peter Audaer Overend Wilson, lately Physician, Ministry of Health, Kuwait.

Australian States

State of Victoria

- David Joseph Bourke. For service to horse-racing.
- Professor Edwin Carlyle Wood. For service to medicine.

State of Queensland

- Professor George Neville Davies. For service to the dental profession and the University of Queensland.
- Bert James Thiess. For services to development in the field of earthmoving and construction.

==== Officer of the Order of the British Empire (OBE) ====
Military Division

Royal Navy

- Commander Peter Reginald Broadbent.
- Commander Ian Kennedy Brooks.
- Commander Charles Michael Caldecott.
- Commander Barry John Carr.
- Commander Alexander Campbell Mackay.
- Commander Alfred Mancais.
- Commander Christopher John Meyer.
- Lieutenant Colonel Robert Wilson Perkins, Royal Marines.
- Commander John Gray Richards.
- Commander Casper William Carnegie Swinley.
- Commander (CCF) Keith Noel Symons, Royal Naval Reserve.

Army

- Lieutenant Colonel Anthony Francis Barnett (421620), Army Catering Corps.
- Lieutenant Colonel William James Bittles (443399), Royal Regiment of Artillery.
- Lieutenant Colonel Trevor Seth Brown (441563), The Royal Regiment of Wales (24th/41st Foot).
- Lieutenant Colonel Christopher John Douglas Bullock, M.C., (463321), 6th Queen Elizabeth's Own Gurkha Rifles.
- Lieutenant Colonel Jon Willoughby Alexander Fleming (448957), The Parachute Regiment.
- Lieutenant Colonel Ian Munro Fraser (441318), Queen's Own Highlanders (Seaforth and Camerons).
- Lieutenant Colonel (Quartermaster) Thomas Harry Hurlock (474563), Royal Regiment of Artillery.
- Lieutenant Colonel (now Colonel) John Edgar Ingham, T.D., (464505), Royal Regiment of Artillery, Territorial Army.
- Lieutenant Colonel (now Acting Colonel) Robert George Long, M.C., (448172), The Royal Hampshire Regiment.
- Lieutenant Colonel Jeremy John George Mackenzie (469051), Queen's Own Highlanders (Seaforth and Camerons).
- Lieutenant Colonel Alaric Philip Norris (490171), Army Legal Corps.
- Lieutenant Colonel (now Colonel) John Leonard Parkes (463382), 2nd King Edward VII's Own Gurkha Rifles (The Sirmoor Rifles).
- Lieutenant Colonel (Quartermaster) Audrey Irene Purton (471901), Women's Royal Army Corps.
- Lieutenant Colonel Peter John Sheppard (471351), Corps of Royal Engineers.
- Lieutenant Colonel Geoffrey Robert Slater (465219), Corps of Royal Electrical and Mechanical Engineers.
- Lieutenant Colonel Rupert Anthony Smith, Q.G.M., (477836), The Parachute Regiment.
- Lieutenant Colonel Robert Christopher Wolverson (471701), Irish Guards.

Royal Air Force

- Wing Commander Anthony John Bendell, AFC, (3517266).
- Wing Commander Michael John Bettell (4231560).
- Wing Commander Keith Bradley (5011691).
- Wing Commander Bernard Michael Edwin Forward (4230403).
- Wing Commander James Robertson Greig (507234).
- Wing Commander David John Loveridge (607843).
- Wing Commander Brian Irving Mason (607706).
- Wing Commander Roy William Beckworth Simons (592366).
- Wing Commander Alan Marcus Wills (608369).
- Wing Commander Brian Arthur Wright, AFC, (4232366).
- Acting Wing Commander Sidney Devereux Little (2449870), Royal Air Force Volunteer Reserve (Training Branch).

Civil Division

- Roland Edward Adams, Governor I, HM Prison Pentonville.
- William Anderson, Principal, Department of Employment.
- Kenneth Arthur Leonard Argent, lately Pastoral Secretary, Church Commissioners for England.
- Henry Eric Ashton, lately Director, Birmingham Institute for the Deaf.
- John Rutherford Bache, Director of Technical Services, IBM UK Ltd.
- Hilda Mary Barber (Sister Hilary). For services to Adult Education in Liverpool.
- Alan Batey, Industrial Relations and Personnel Manager, Highlands Fabricators.
- Marjory Ann Beastall. For Political and Public Service in the East Midlands.
- William Blackledge Beaumont. For services to Rugby Football.
- Ronald George Bedford, Science Editor, Daily Mirror.
- James David Benzies, lately President, Scottish Building Employers' Federation.
- Bessie Bicknell, Chairman, Dorset Social Services Committee.
- Robert Basil Blackburn, QFSM, Chief Fire Officer, West Sussex Fire Brigade.
- Ruth Annie Blatherwick. For services to the community in Newark, Nottinghamshire.
- Norman William Boorer, lately Corporate Planning Executive, British Aerospace plc.
- John Edward Bozman. For Political Service in Yorkshire.
- John William Brewster, Managing Director, Gee & Webb Ltd.
- Gerald Crofton Briggs, Sales Director, Marconi Instruments Ltd. For services to Export.
- Professor Leonard Broadbent, Chairman, British Agrochemicals Supply Industry Scheme.
- Henry Faulkner-Brown, MC, Architect, Faulkner-Brown, Hendy, Watkinson, Stonor, Newcastle upon Tyne.
- Horace Stanley Burden, lately Managing Director (Wholesale), Charringtons Solid Fuel Ltd.
- Christopher Godfrey Reader Buxton, President, The Abbeyfield Society.
- Walter Buchanan Campbell, Director, Cameron Iron Works Ltd.
- John Dudley Chittock, Film and Television Writer, Director and Producer.
- Christopher Robert Chope, Leader, London Borough of Wandsworth.
- Norman Clarke, Secretary and Registrar, Institute of Mathematics and its Applications.
- Raymond Lewis Clarke, General Secretary, British Boxing Board of Control.
- Martin Youart Cobb, MBE, lately Consultant, Safety and Health, Confederation of British Industry.
- Vernon James Henry Cocking, Senior Legal Assistant, Board of Customs and Excise.
- George Edward, Cole, DSM, Senior Principal, Board of Inland Revenue.
- Arthur Kenneth Coleman, Managing Director, Re-Chem International Ltd.
- Lewis Butler Cooke, Vice-Chairman, Mental Health Appeal.
- Thomas Cowie. For Political Service in Northern England.
- Vivienne Maxine Vaughan-Cox. For services to the Girl Guides Association.
- Albert Ferdinand Donal Crawley, Director of Development, Northern Ireland Housing Executive.
- Brian Landless Cunliffe. For Political Service in North Western England.
- Hester Margaret Curtis, Headmistress, Hornsey School for Girls.
- Dorothy Danvers Dakin, Headmistress, The Red Maids' School, Bristol.
- Kenneth William Dale, TD, Consulting Engineer, Dale & Goldfinger.
- Kathleen Dancy, Deputy Chairman, Bracknell Development Corporation.
- James Dargde, Controller of Audit, Commission for Local Authority Accounts in Scotland.
- Harry Maurice Darwell, Managing Director, I.M.I. Summerfield. For services to Export.
- Bryn Davies, Traffic Commissioner, South Wales Traffic Area.
- Marjorie Johnstone Davis, Chairman, Council of Professions Supplementary to Medicine.
- William Church de la Porte. For services to the Young Men's Christian Associations.
- Margaret Anne Dennis, Principal Research Officer, Ministry of Agriculture, Fisheries and Food.
- Mary Dilnot (Mrs. Ruffle), lately Editor, Woman's Weekly.
- Charles Lynton Dodd, lately Chairman, Board of Management, National Chamber of Trade.
- Kenneth Arthur Dodd, Entertainer and for charitable services.
- Eve Dudding, Deputy President, Northumbria Branch, British Red Cross Society.
- Kenneth John Dyos, Headmaster, Hylton Red House Comprehensive School, Sunderland.
- Samuel Morton Edwardson, Administrator, Surrey Family Practitioner Committee.
- Ruby Ivy Farebrother (Mrs. Blois), Divisional Nursing Officer (Midwifery), Salop Area Health Authority.
- Kenneth Farnell, lately Principal, Cornwall Technical College, Redruth.
- Lawrence Harold Farnsworth, Principal, Brighton Technical College.
- Dorothea Margaret Sybil Farnworth. For Political and Public Service in North Western England.
- Lieutenant Colonel Sir Peter Walter Farquhar, Bt., DSO, Vice President, National Association of Boys' Clubs.
- John Desmond Augustine Fennell, QC. For Political Service in Wessex.
- Audrey Firth. For services to the community in Bradford.
- John Miles Fitzpatrick, Medical Practitioner, HMS Pembroke, Ministry of Defence.
- Major Peter Duncan Forsyth-Forrest, Chairman, West Midlands Engineering Employers' Association.
- William Forrest, TD, lately Deputy Director (Mining) (Selby Project), North Yorkshire Area, National Coal Board.
- Dennis Frederick Harold Hyde Frost, MBE, Chief Executive, Intermediate Technology Development Group.
- Douglas Garnett, lately Chief Administrative Officer and Cost Accountant, North Yorkshire County Council.
- William Keith Elliott Geddes, Deputy Keeper, Science Museum.
- Thomas Rees George, For services to Local Government in Dyfed.
- Hugh Morton Gilmour, lately Principal Scientific Officer, Ministry of Defence.
- Susan, Lady Glover, Chairman, National Adoption Society.
- James Claverhouse Graham, Surgeon-in-Chief, St. John Ambulance Brigade.
- Rae Gemmell Grant. For Political Service in Scotland.
- William Edward Grant, Chairman, Kirton Experimental Horticulture Station Advisory Committee.
- William George Brown Grant. For public service in Manchester.
- James Eric Greenwood, Principal Professional and Technology Officer, Department of the Environment.
- David Howard Griffiths, Regional Chairman, Eastern Region, British Gas Corporation.
- John Moses Griffiths, North Wales Officer, North Wales District, Transport & General Workers' Union.
- Maurice Juniper Guymer, DL, Chairman, Board of Visitors, Latchmere House Remand Centre.
- Marjorie Joan Hadley, Chairman, Hereford and Worcester County Council.
- Douglas Cresswell Hall, Chairman, Hall Automation Ltd.
- Audrey Gweneth Hallam, Deputy Chief Probation Officer, South Yorkshire Probation and After-Care Service.
- Hilary Alicia Halpin, lately Vice-Chairman, Women's Forum.
- John Alexander Don Harrison, Chairman, James Johnston & Company of Elgin Ltd.
- Cyril Edwin Hart, Senior Verderer, Forest of Dean.
- Ernest James Harvey, For Political Service.
- Joseph Hennessy, Vice-President, Disabled Drivers' Association.
- Gertrude Hermes (Gertrude Anna Bertha Hughes-Stanton), Sculptor and wood engraver.
- Brenda Joan Howe, Chief Adviser, Leeds Local Education Authority.
- Douglas Arthur Douglas-Hughes, For services to the Magistracy in Essex.
- John Alfred Roberts Hughes, Director, Dundee Centre, Scottish Curriculum Development Service.
- Max Jaffa, Violinist. For services to music.
- John Bennett Jenkins, Clerk to the Justices, Bedwellty.
- Harry Gordon Jessop. For Political and Public Service in Eastern England.
- James Frederick Johnson, Registrar, University of Reading.
- Thomas Johnston, Managing Director, Barr & Stroud Ltd.
- Major Albert Kenneth Crisp-Jones, TD, Chairman and Managing Director, A. Edward Jones Ltd.
- Eirwyn Jones, Principal, Bridgend College of Technology.
- Elwyn Owain Jones, lately Chief Economist, Esso Petroleum Co. Ltd.
- Captain Sidney George John Keene, Head, Department of Maritime Studies and Fisheries, Grimsby College of Technology.
- Norman Kellett, lately Director of Housing, Leeds City Council.
- Robert McFarlane Kelly, Principal, Rathgael School, Bangor, Co. Down.
- Ian Maxwell Kelsall, Regional Director, Confederation of British Industry.
- Robert Taylor Killen, Assistant Chief Constable, Royal Ulster Constabulary.
- Alan Frederick King, Manager, Police Mutual Assurance Society.
- Margaret Mary King, Headmistress, Fred Longworth High School, Tyldesley, Wigan.
- James Jocelyn Landers. For services to the Royal British Legion in the South West.
- George Richmond Langdale, lately Senior Lecturer, Welbeck College, Ministry of Defence.
- Celia Jean, Lady Liggins. For Political Service in the West Midlands.
- George Robert Lloyd, lately National Organiser, Amalgamated Union of Engineering Workers (Engineering Section).
- Elizabeth Marian Logan, Area Nursing Officer, North Yorkshire Area Health Authority.
- Alan Longworth, lately County Librarian, Lancashire.
- William Lang Denholm McCue, Singer.
- Marjorie Mary McInnes, Convener, Scottish Council on Disability.
- Elizabeth McLaren (Mrs. Burnett), Secretary, Scottish Board, Royal College of Nursing.
- Archibald Macleod, Head, Argyll Area Agricultural Advisory Service, West of Scotland Agricultural College.
- Margaret McLeod, Deputy Director, Fine Arts Department, British Council.
- Clare Macmahon, lately Chairman, Fire Authority for Northern Ireland.
- Mary McMahon, Member, Eastern Area Health and Social Services Board, Northern Ireland.
- Donald John Macmillan. For Political and Public Service in Western England.
- Helen Elizabeth Mair, District Community Physician, Medway Health District, Kent Area Health Authority.
- Ronald Massarella. For services to Show Jumping.
- Elizabeth Jean Ramsay Massey, Vice-President, Glasgow Branch, Soldiers' Sailors' and Airmen's Families Association.
- Ralph Maybourn, General Manager, B.P. Shipping Ltd.
- Brian Alexander Meek, Member, Lothian Regional Council.
- Professor Wilfrid Howard Mellers. For services to music.
- Leonard Charles Merryweather, Deputy Managing Director, Sealink UK Ltd.
- John Mitchell, Principal, Board of Inland Revenue.
- Major Charles Frankland Moore. For services to the British Limbless Ex-Servicemen's Association.
- Kenneth William Morris, lately Senior Principal, Department of Education and Science.
- Peter Charles Neivens, QPM, Deputy Assistant Commissioner, Metropolitan Police.
- Keith Padden, Senior Purchasing Director, Fine Fare Ltd.
- Monroe Edward Palmer. For Political service.
- William James Patterson, Chief Officer, Belfast Education and Library Board.
- John Ithell Payne, Crops Officer, Intervention Board for Agricultural Produce, Ministry of Agriculture Fisheries and Food.
- Edward Percival, Executive Chairman, P & O European Transport Services Ltd.
- Mary Bridget (Mamie) Perry. For Political and Public Service in Greater London.
- Graham Leonard Buckton Pitt, Head of Legal Services, The Building Societies Association.
- Alexander Poliakoff, President, Multitone Electronics plc. For services to Export.
- Roger Priestley, Principal, Department of Trade.
- Reginald James Raff, Financial Director, Dynamics Group, British Aerospace plc. For services to Export.
- Francis Maxwell Rainey, Chairman and Managing Director, Denroy Group Ltd.
- Andrew Forbes Ravenhill, TD, Principal, Ministry of Defence.
- Marie Reffold. For services to the community in Humberside.
- Leonard Charles Reynolds, DSC, DL, Chairman, National Activities Board, The Scout Association.
- William Alfred Richardson, lately Engineering Director, British Caledonian Airways.
- William Arnold Ridley, Actor and Writer.
- William Arthur Thomson Robb, Surgeon, Royal Northern Infirmary and Raigmore Hospital, Inverness.
- John Iley Rogers, Senior Official, Greater Merseyside Area, Union of Construction, Allied Trades and Technicians.
- James Rose, Principal Collector of Taxes, Board of Inland Revenue.
- Theresa Science Russell. For services to the community in Newcastle upon Tyne.
- Ivan St. Clair Scott, Senior Principal, Scottish Office.
- David Henry Sharp, General Secretary, Society of Chemical Industry.
- Arthur George Shaw, Deputy Director and Secretary, Association of the British Pharmaceutical Industry.
- David Teignmouth Shore, Managing Director, The APV Company Ltd.
- Ronald Sidaway, Chairman, Ductile Steels Ltd.
- Harry James Sim, Vice-Convener, Grampian Regional Council.
- William John Slater, Director of Physical Education, University of Birmingham.
- Geoffrey Verney Smith, Director, London Tourist Board, and London Convention Bureau.
- Janet Buchanan Adam Smith (Mrs. Carleton), Writer.
- Kenneth Jeffrey Solly, Chairman, National Federation of Gateway Clubs.
- Geoffrey Tallent Spencer. For services to disabled people.
- Sidney Edwin Stapley, Senior Principal, Department of Health and Social Security.
- Ronald Charles Steventon, QPM, Deputy Assistant Commissioner, Metropolitan Police.
- Matthew Woodrow Jack Stirrat, QPM, Assistant to HM Chief Inspector of Constabulary for Scotland.
- Herbert Sulzbach. For services to Anglo-German relations.
- Stanley Rees Tanner, Director of New Business and Advanced Development Division, Racal-Decca Marine Radar.
- Jonathan Taylor, Leader, Trafford Metropolitan Borough Council.
- Richard John Taylor, Managing Director, Quantel Ltd. For services to Export.
- Gerald Harvey Thompson. For services to the Film Industry.
- George Robert Thomson, TD. For services to Scottish legal scholarship and publication.
- Philip Eaton Thorne, Headmaster, Exmouth School, Devon.
- John Stanleigh Turner, President, National Council of the Sand and Gravel Association Ltd.
- Rowland Walker, Chairman and Managing Director, Rotary Electrical Company Ltd.
- Ernest Stanley Wall, President, Scottish Hockey Association.
- Evelyn Lucy Walters. For Political and Public Service in Wales.
- Geoffrey Wesley Ward, VRD, Executive Director, James Neill Holdings Ltd. For services to Export.
- Beryl Eunice Mary Warne, Area Nursing Officer, Dorset Area Health Authority.
- Thomas Watkinson, QPM, Assistant Chief Constable, Lancashire Constabulary.
- John McDonald Watson, TD. For Political Service.
- Graham Alexander Webster. For services to archaeology.
- Michael Arthur Weller, General Medical Practitioner, Thaxted, Essex.
- Bernard Patrick Joseph Wex, Partner, Freeman, Fox & Partners.
- Ernest Whittington, Governor Class II, Northern Ireland Prison Service.
- John Kyffin Williams, Painter.
- Cuthbert Gibson Wood, Principal Professional and Technology Officer, Ministry of Defence.
- Martin Francis Wood, Chairman, Oxford Instruments Ltd. For services to Export.
- The Honourable Mark Hugh Wyndham, MC, Chairman, Executive Committee, Church of England Children's Society.
- Victor Yarsley. For services to the plastics industry.

Diplomatic Service and Overseas List

- Jeremy John Barnett, British Council Representative, Turkey.
- Brian Leslie Giovanni Beeson. For services to the British community in Bangladesh.
- Wing Commander Leslie Herbert Best, Royal Air Force (Retd.), lately International Staff, NATO, Brussels.
- Wentworth Lyndhurst Bodden, Principal Secretary, Cayman Islands.
- Peter Valentine Lingard Botham. For services to British commercial interests in Austria.
- John Leslie Boyer. For public and community services in Hong Kong.
- Dr. Derek Willis Braithwaite, Provincial Medical Officer, Medical Department, Zambia.
- Dr. Rupert Maurice Clarke. For medical and welfare services to the community in Thailand.
- Hugh Roland Crooke, Cultural Attache, HM Embassy, Washington.
- Timothy Lancaster Davey. For services to land development in Fiji.
- Stanley Lewis Davis. For services to the British community in Malta.
- John Spencer Don, Director of Development, New Territories, Hong Kong.
- Dr. William Garth Dyson. For services to forestry development in Costa Rica.
- Ronald Elliott. For services to British commercial interests in the Pacific.
- Reginald Irvine George. For services toi British ex-Servicemen in the Irish Republic.
- John Anthony Forrestal Hailwood. For services to British commercial interests in Barbados.
- Roland Xavier Hindmarsh, English Language Adviser, British Council, Belgium.
- Dr. Kam-fai Ho. For public and community services in Hong Kong.
- Jack Lionel William Hobbs, HM Consul, British Consulate-General, Geneva.
- Joseph Whitworth Hulse, Honorary British Consul, Arica, Chile.
- Harry Stewart Jackson. For services to the British community in Karachi.
- Jeremy Scott Jasper, lately First Secretary (Commercial), British Deputy High Commission, Bombay.
- Frederick Thomas McHardy Jones, Crown Solicitor, Attorney Generals Department, Hong Kong.
- Basil Frank Manners Leighton. For services to British commercial and community interests in Bahrain.
- Frank Linington, Principal Assessor, Income Tax Department, Kenya.
- James Stewart Fraser McDavid. For services to British commercial interests in Barcelona.
- William Ernest Wilmot Mattey, First Secretary (Administration) HM Embassy, Copenhagen.
- Ian McLean Desmond Murphy. For services to British commercial interests in Jamaica.
- David Kennedy Newbigging. For public services in Hong Kong.
- Peter Nichols. For services to journalism in Italy and to Anglo-Italian relations.
- Elizabeth Park Ogilvie, First Secretary and Consul, HM Consulate-General, Munich.
- George David Rennie. For services to British commercial interests in Jordan.
- Brian John Shapcott. For services to British commercial and community interests in Nigeria.
- Professor David Todd. For public services in Hong Kong.
- John Anthony Benedict Vernon, lately Interr national Staff, NATO, Brussels.
- Michael Ward, TD, HM Consul, British Consulate, Salonika.
- George Francis Alfred Warwick. For services to British commercial interests in Hong Kong.
- James Bull Watson. For services to British commercial interests in Zambia.
- Peter John Weavers. For services to British commercial interests in India.
- Colin Keith Woodfield, lately Deputy Governor, Belize.
- Dr. Reginald Edward Wright, Regional Representative, British Council, Madras.

Australian States

State of Victoria

- Alfred Murray Clarke. For service to medicine.
- Cuthbert Oswald Harry. For service to ex-servicemen.
- Dr. Donald William Hossack. For service to road safety and the arts.
- John Johnson. For public service.
- David Campbell Jones. For service to the Moomba Festival.
- Patricia Carmel Stewart Kennedy. For service to the performing arts.
- Ubaldo Larobina. For service to disabled persons and the Italian community.
- Joy Mein. For services to the community.

State of Queensland

- Ronald Edward McAuliffe. For services to politics, sport and the community.
- Dr. Keith Stronach Mowatt, Director, Queensland Radium Institute.
- Ian McIntosh Suter. For services to the community.
- Charles Viertel. For services to the blind and the community.
- Robert William Wicks. For services to local government and primary industry associations.

State of South Australia

- Thomas Maxwell Gregg. For services to industrial relations and the community.
- Herbert John Lowe. For services to sport.
- John Anthony Nelson. For services to viticulture and the community.

State of Western Australia

- Arthur John Gillam. For service to the community.
- William Willaton Mitchell. For public service and service to the community.
- Laurence Steuart Turnbull, JP. For service to local government, sport and the community.

==== Member of the Order of the British Empire (MBE) ====
Military Division

Royal Navy

- Lieutenant Commander Charles Poland Addis.
- Lieutenant Commander Horace Edward Caisley.
- Fleet Chief Weapon Engineering Mechanic (O) Derick Morey Collins, M927613W.
- Lieutenant Commander Michael Selby Cooke.
- Lieutenant Commander Duncan John Eld Davidson.
- Lieutenant Commander Peter David Goodin.
- Lieutenant Commander Dean Stuart Harriss.
- Captain Colin Francis Healy, Royal Marines.
- Lieutenant Commander (SCC) Ronald Hutchings Jones, Royal Naval Reserve.
- Lieutenant Ian Kemplay.
- Lieutenant Commander (SCC) John Robert Desmond Lewington, Royal Naval Reserve.
- Lieutenant Commander Walter Joseph Mayers.
- First Officer Mary Sheila Nicholas, RD, Women's Royal Naval Reserve.
- Warrant Officer 2 Andrew Thomas Opray, Royal Marines, PO18211M
- Lieutenant Commander Dudley Malcolm Charles Pope.
- Lieutenant Commander Victor Thomas Charles Prodger.
- Acting Lieutenant Commander Kenneth Reith.

Army

- Major Alastair Ralph McCorkindale Adams (465323), Royal Corps of Transport.
- Major Paul Stephen Adams (483844), Corps of Royal Engineers.
- Major (Queen's Gurkha Officer) Amarbahadur Thapa, MVO, (481220), 10th Princess Mary's Own Gurkha Rifles.
- Captain (Local Major) (Quartermaster) Peter Andrews (496519), Military Provost Staff Corps.
- LS/22820759 Warrant Officer Class 2 (Acting Warrant Officer Class 1) Jack Bertram Bannister, Army Physical Training Corps.
- Major Christopher Beeton (407754), Royal Regiment of Artillery.
- Major (Quartermaster) Michael Walter Buxton Best (490035), Corps of Royal Engineers.
- Major Robert Frederick Binham (488390), Royal Corps of Signals.
- 24031150 Warrant Officer Class 2 Adrian Geoffrey Paul Chambers, Intelligence Corps.
- 23532589 Warrant Officer Class 1 Gerald Charles Chappel, The Royal Hussars (Prince of Wales's Own).
- Captain Jean Anita Chiswell (392414), Women's Royal Army Corps, Territorial Army.
- 23477881 Warrant Officer Class 2 Patrick Colclough, Royal Corps of Transport, Territorial Army.
- Major Walter Kenneth Cross, TD, (284403), Special Air Service Regiment, Territorial Army (now Retired).
- Major John Vernon Dent (459241), The Royal Scots (The Royal Regiment).
- Major (Queen's Gurkha Officer) Deokumar Rai, MVO, (487338), 7th Duke of Edinburgh's Own Gurkha Rifles.
- 23703206 Warrant Officer Class 1 William Francis Fullerton, Scots Guards.
- 24087994 Warrant Officer Class 2 Frederick William Gardner, Royal Corps of Signals.
- 23650858 Warrant Officer Class 1 David Handley Special Air Service Regiment.
- Major Nigel Michael Haynes (476538), 2nd King Edward VII's Own Gurkha Rifles (The Sirmoor Rifles).
- Major (Quartermaster) William John Holbrook (494695), Coldstream Guards.
- Major (Assistant Paymaster) Anthony James Eric Hollis (496416), Royal Army Pay Corps.
- LS/22502533 Warrant Officer Class 1 Ronald Michael Kenny, DCM, The King's Regiment.
- Major Stewart Law (479788), Royal Corps of Signals.
- Captain Hudson Hugh McLeod (486699), The Argyll and Sutherland Highlanders (Princess Louise's) (now R.A.R.O.).
- 24062916 Warrant Officer Class 2 Paul Mitchell, QGM, Royal Army Ordnance Corps.
- 22215378 Warrant Officer Class 1 William Muir, BEM, Scots Guards.
- Major Peter Brian Page (483540), Corps of Royal Engineers.
- Major (Quartermaster) John Hector Peters (492043), The Duke of Edinburgh's Royal Regiment (Berkshire and Wiltshire).
- Major (Quartermaster) Tudor Price (481567), The Royal Regiment of Wales (24th/41st Foot).
- Captain (Quartermaster) Alexander David Prosser (500630), 17th/21st Lancers.
- Major Albert Edward Read (464683), Corps of Royal Electrical and Mechanical Engineers.
- Captain Ruby Ruston (384271), Women's Royal Army Corps, Territorial Army.
- Major Ronald Arthur Schulz, TD, (491755), The Parachute Regiment, Territorial Army.
- 23866197 Warrant Officer Class 1 Bernard Francis Simpson, The Honourable Artillery Company, Territorial Army.
- Major Michael Charles Boddington Smart (469096), Scots Guards.
- Major Geoffrey Smith (497050), Royal Army Ordnance Corps.
- Major John Douglas Stokoe (486748), Royal Corps of Signals.
- Major Raymond Kenneth Thompson (497531), Corps of Royal Military Police.
- Major (now Lieutenant Colonel) Roger Mowbray Vere (471375), Royal Regiment of Artillery.
- Acting Major James Miller Watson (160589), Army Cadet Force, Territorial Army.
- Major (now Brevet Lieutenant Colonel) Robert John William Wyatt, TD, (438659), Corps of Royal Military Police, Territorial Army (now Retired).

Royal Air Force

- Squadron Leader Andrew Vernon Ades (4231136).
- Squadron Leader Robert Albert Blakeley (4055231).
- Squadron Leader William George Bradley (507978).
- Squadron Leader David William Broughton (2617380).
- Squadron Leader Dennis Crowson (579838).
- Squadron Leader David Frederick Edward Eden (607432).
- Squadron Leader Charles Long (584050).
- Squadron Leader Peter John Lynton Watton (505136).
- Acting Squadron Leader Alexander Joseph Clarke (206551), Royal Air Force Volunteer Reserve (Training Branch).
- Acting Squadron Leader Bernard Roy Newman (3502333), Royal Air Force Volunteer Reserve (Training Branch).
- Flight Lieutenant Anthony Howard Guttridge (4233194).
- Warrant Officer Anthony John Bennison (Ml924768).
- Warrant Officer John William Bullock (P4013778).
- Warrant Officer Michael Roy Ives (N2753442).
- Warrant Officer Johnston McBain (K4088119).
- Warrant Officer Andrew Manson, RVM, (M4073248), Royal Air Force Regiment.
- Warrant Officer Michael Eden Melville (S4241044).
- Warrant Officer Robert Charles O'Brien (E1906216).
- Warrant Officer David Frederick Pellatt (D0588045).
- Warrant Officer Mary Isabel Robertson (X2127239), Women's Royal Air Force.
- Warrant Officer Desmond Ernest Sonley, BEM, (S3042932).
- Warrant Officer Hubert George Thorne, BEM, (Q4014435).
- Warrant Officer Peter Thomas Walter, BEM, (F3514590).
- Master Air Electronics Operator Michael John O'Connell (L3515761).

Overseas Award

- Squadron Leader John Geoffrey Shawcross, Royal Hong Kong Auxiliary Air Force.

Civil Division

- Leonard Cook-Abbott, lately Higher Executive Officer, Department of Health and Social Security.
- Cyril John Abel, Principal Assistant, Consumer Service Section, East Midlands Electricity Board.
- Eve Mary Hudson Allen, Senior Executive Officer, Ministry of Defence.
- Clifford William Allick. For Political Service.
- Charlotte Proctor Anderson. For services to the community in Grantown-on-Spey.
- John Francis Herbert Aspinwall, Engineering Manager, Rediffusion Radio Systems Limited.
- Hildegard Atherton, Member, Coventry Churches Housing Association.
- Peter Derek Avis, Manager, Planning and Methods, Tileman & Company Limited.
- George James Bailey. For services to the community in Stafford.
- Elizabeth Maud Barham, Nurse in Medical Practice, Luton.
- Kenneth Barritt, Chief Superintendent, Cleveland Constabulary.
- Roy Barson. For services to the Boys' Brigade in Yorkshire and Humberside.
- Wilma Maud Batchelor, Secretary, Cambridgeshire Mental Welfare Association.
- Barbara Beavis. For Political and Public Service in Western England.
- Patricia Tempe Behr, Information Officer, Department of the Environment.
- William John Bell. For services to disabled people in Manchester.
- Trevor Hellier Berrill. For services to the community in Coventry.
- Stanley Ernest Biddiscombe, lately Divisional Officer, South West Wales, Iron & Steel Trades Confederation.
- Douglas Elmer Bird, Field Service Manager, CompAir Industrial Limited. For services to Export.
- Stanley Herbert Boddington. For services to brass band music.
- Olive Beatrice Bogle, Deputy Principal, Department of Manpower Services, Northern Ireland.
- James Boyd. For Political and Public service.
- Robert James Boyd. For services to the St. John Ambulance Association in Northern Ireland.
- Frederick Lionel Francis Brampton. For services to the London Tourist Board.
- George Henry Brasford, President, Jersey Green Room Club.
- Pauline Thurlow Turner Bridger. For Political Service in Wessex.
- Richard William Brierley, Electronics Technician, Department of Civil Engineering, University of Birmingham.
- Ethel Brooks, Chairman, Management Committee, London Borough of Greenwich, Citizens Advice Bureau.
- Margaret Lilian Thelma Brooks, Collector of Taxes, Board of Inland Revenue.
- George Ronald Brown, Executive Editor, British National Formulary.
- Henry Ernest Bruce, Senior Executive Officer, Department of Health and Social Security.
- Marie Bryan, School Nurse, Newham Health District, City and East London Area Health Authority.
- Alfred Leonard Frank Buttle, DSM, Warden, Further Education Centre, Pembroke Dock.
- James Frederick Byford, lately General Secretary, Shipwrecked Mariners' Society.
- William Charles Robert Bygrave, Higher Executive Officer, Department of Health and Social Security.
- Anthony George Byron, Professional and Technology Officer Grade I, Ministry of Defence.
- Elizabeth Camden, Senior Nursing Officer, Royal Liverpool Hospital.
- Thomas Camden. For services to the community in Hereford and Worcester.
- John Campbell, Chairman, Lossiemouth and Lochinver Branch, Scottish White Fish Producers' Association.
- Noel Bertram Capindale, Divisional Officer, North Eastern Division, Union of Shop, Distributive and Allied Workers.
- Malcolm Norman Carrington, Senior Assistant Education Officer (Sites and Buildings), Walsall Metropolitan District Council.
- Vera Carter. For Political Service in North Western England.
- Sylvia Edith Carvell, Director, Association of Building Component Manufacturers.
- Alexander Forbes Catto, General Medical Practitioner, Forfar.
- Barren Leslie Chambers, lately Professional and Technology Officer I, Metropolitan Police.
- Laura Chisholm. For Political and Public Service in Scotland.
- Ernest James Chiverton, Senior Industrial Relations Adviser, Employee Relations Department, Esso Refinery, Fawley.
- Margaret Clarke, Senior Librarian, Overseas Development Administration.
- Dorothy Mary Clarkson, Principal Clerk, Education Department, Inner London Education Authority.
- Denys Charles Primrose Cochrane, Train Planning Officer, Glasgow, British Rail.
- Sebastian Coe. For services to Athletics.
- Eleanor Ruby Coghlan, lately Executive Officer, Paymaster General's Office.
- Neil Chapman Coles. For services to Golf.
- Ronald Conn, Senior Probation Officer, Inner London Probation and After-Care Service.
- Mary Theodora Cooke, County Organiser, East Sussex, Women's Royal Voluntary Service.
- Rosaleen Agnes Sheila Corser. For services to the community in Cornwall.
- Elizabeth Ann Cowe, Air Stewardess, Dan-Air Services Ltd.
- Joyce Mary Cowlard, Higher Scientific Officer, Ministry of Defence.
- John Crabtree, President, Goole Unit, Sea Cadet Corps.
- Francis William Cree, Chairman, Mencap Committee, Grantham.
- James Cummings, Deputy Chief Officer, Northamptonshire Fire Brigade.
- Harry Tilford Curtis. For services to Inter-Schools Sport.
- Charles James Daborn, DFM, Administrator (Capital Works), Lanarkshire Health Board.
- William Arthur Dale, Senior Small Industries Organiser, Leicestershire, CoSIRA.
- George Daniels, Horologist.
- Peggy Elizabeth Davies, Senior Personal Secretary, Department of Health and Social Security.
- David John Dearnley, lately Principal Lecturer in Applied Photography, Harrow College of Higher Education.
- Maurice Deighan, Higher Executive Officer, Lord Chancellor's Department.
- Albert Leopold deMuynck, Engineering Manager, Communication and Control Division, Philips Business Systems Group.
- Ivy Constance Campbell Dendy. For services to the community in Bude.
- Janet Isabella Dickson. For political Service in Scotland.
- Ruth Marjorie Dickson, Member, Stafford Borough Council.
- Stuart Dobb, Senior Executive Officer, Department of Health and Social Security.
- Harriet Margaretta (Mary) Dodd. For services to the community in Watford.
- Alan Edward Donald, Senior Consultant, Ernest A. Notcutt & Company Ltd.
- Thomas Graden Douglas, Senior Divisional Officer, Fire Authority for Northern Ireland.
- Alexander Dudgeon, Veterinary Officer, Ministry of Agriculture, Fisheries and Food.
- James Wann Duncan, Member, Tayside Health Board.
- Mary Forrest Duncan, lately Personal Secretary, Ministry of Defence.
- Joyce Heather Dunkley, Community Nursing Sister, Cornwall and Isles of Scilly Area Health Authority.
- Christopher George Durrant, Assistant Chief Officer, Oxfordshire Fire Brigade.
- Henry James Herbert Dyer. For services to the community in Lincolnshire.
- John Keith Edwards, Assistant Chief Engineer, External Services, British Broadcasting Corporation.
- Audrey Mary Ellis. For Political and Public Service in Wessex.
- Reginald Emmerson. For services to the Royal Air Forces Association in Great Yarmouth.
- Alan Stephen Frank Etherington. Project Manager (London), British Rail Property Board.
- Margaret Evelyn Evans, Head Teacher, Penygloddfa Primary School, Newtown, Powys.
- Brian Dormer Fairchild, Depot Engineer (Major) London Transport.
- Frederick Kenneth Faulkner, Assistant Director of Supplies, Southfields Depot, Greater London Council.
- Dorothy Ormrod Fawell, General Adviser, Nursery and Infant Education, Bolton Local Education Authority.
- Enid Christine Fenton. For services to Save The Children Fund in Scotland.
- Edward Lawson Ferguson, lately Construction Manager, Sullom Voe Project, BP Petroleum Development (UK) Ltd.
- John Wilkinson Ferguson, General Medical Practitioner, Salford.
- William Fielding, Professional and Technology Officer I, Utility Services, Engineering Division, Atomic Energy Research Establishment, Harwell.
- Harry Leonard Ford, Managing Director, PEM Board Company Ltd.
- Frank Forrest, Manager, Progeny Testing Centre, Milk Marketing Board.
- Doreen Foster, Foreign and Commonwealth Office.
- Edward Foulkes, DCM, MM. For services to the Dunkirk Veterans' Association.
- John Reginald Wharton French, lately Headmaster, Ewing School for the Deaf, Nottingham.
- Thomas Alexander Maxwell Frood, Superintendent, Strathclyde Police.
- Winifred Annie Mary Gauntlett, Senior Personal Secretary, Board of Inland Revenue.
- Major Thomas Alexander Edwin Gibson, Chief Records Officer, Commonwealth War Graves Commission.
- Jean Gillard. For Political and Public Service in Western England.
- Mabel Constance Gillman, lately Organising Secretary, Doncaster and District Association for the Welfare of the Disabled.
- George Ferguson Goddard. For services to Cricket in Scotland.
- Elisabeth Godwin, Senior Executive Officer, Department of Employment.
- Audrey Jean Gough, Private Secretary, British Leyland plc.
- Lily Margaret Gray, Higher Executive Officer, Home Office.
- Molly Adelaide Griffin. For services to the elderly in Bath.
- Jessie Ruby Griffiths. For services to local government in Norwich.
- Marjorie Griffiths. For services to the community, particularly disabled people, in Warrington.
- William James Hamilton, lately Deputy Superintendent of Cleansing, Belfast City Council.
- Edward Leonard Hammett. For services to the Royal British Legion in Newport, Gwent.
- Herbert Frederick Hanscombe, lately Senior Executive Officer, Board of Customs and Excise.
- William Bernard Harding. For Political and Public Service in Western England.
- Lieutenant Commander Thomas William Harford, Royal Navy (Retd.), lately Member, Dudley and Sandwell District Manpower Committee.
- Jean Hargreaves, lately Headmistress, Ridge County Infants School, Lancaster.
- John Hamilton Harley, Senior Fire Service Administration Officer, Central Region Fire Brigade.
- David Thomas George Harris, lately Works General Manager, Aberthaw and Bristol Channel, Portland Cement Company Limited.
- Gwynneth Mary Harris, Head, Department of Creative Studies, Rotherham College of Arts and Technology.
- Alfred Joseph Harrison, Director, Manufacturing Services for Marconi Avionics.
- Barbara Hart, lately Superintendent, Cumberlow Lodge, Regional Assessment Centre for Girls, London Borough of Lambeth.
- Jean Haslam, Chairman, Hampstead Old Peoples Housing Trust.
- George Hay. For services to architectural restoration in Scotland.
- John Philip Hayes, Chief Rent Officer, West Midlands.
- Walter Ronald Hayward, Secretary and Industrial Relations Officer, Universities' Committee for Non-Teaching Staffs.
- Elizabeth Garland Hewlins. For services to the Pro Corda Chamber Music School.
- John Kedward Hickman, General Secretary, Birmingham Federation of Boys' Clubs.
- Graham Charles Hill, Professional and Technology Officer Grade I, Department of the Environment.
- Leonard William Hodgson. For Political Service in South Eastern England.
- William Vint Hogg, Member, Warrenpoint Harbour Authority.
- James Laurence Marshall Hole, Assistant Director, British Health-Care Export Council. For services to Export.
- James Henry Holl, TD, Assistant Director, (Establishments), National Ports Council.
- Henry Gordon Holmes, lately Works Director, Mid Sussex Times.
- Lyndhurst Morgan Howells, Farmer, Cymmer, West Glamorgan.
- John Henry Huddy, Senior Executive Officer, Department of Employment.
- Leslie Johnson Hughes, Director, Hughes Audio Vision Limited.
- Sidney Hubert Hull, Assistant Division Officer, Ordnance Survey.
- Benjamin Reginald Hunt, lately Senior Development Officer (Road Safety), Royal Society for the Prevention of Accidents.
- George Samuel Thomas Hurry, General Manager, South West Durham Engineering Training Association Limited.
- Agnes Christina Hutchison, District Domestic Services Manager, Lothian Health Board.
- Theresa Joan Eileen Hutton, Senior Area Housing Officer, Allerdale District Council.
- William Alfred Ismay. For services to the study of ceramics.
- William Jackson, Works Manager, Stocksbridge Works, British Steel Corporation.
- Donald Douglas Jameson, Senior Executive Officer, Department of Health and Social Security.
- Colin Jocelyn Jeffries. For services to the St. Paul's Cathedral Trust.
- Marion Elizabeth Jepson, lately Specialist in Community Medicine (Child Health), Sheffield Area Health Authority.
- Jane Johnston, Teacher, Fleming Fulton School, Belfast.
- Jessie Jones, Personal Secretary, Board of Customs and Excise.
- William Owen Jones, Headmaster, Albion Junior School, West Bromwich.
- Margaret Tuer Jordan. For services to the community in Kidderminster.
- Thomas George Keeling, Director and General Manager, Bevan Simpson Foundry Ltd.
- Melvin John Edward Keen, County Health and Safety Officer, Durham County Council.
- Donald Joseph Kelly, Assistant Director, Staffordshire, St. John Ambulance Association.
- Mary Elizabeth Kelly, Personal Secretary, Northern Ireland Region, The National Trust.
- Margaret Rosemary Olive Kemp. For services to disabled people in Keswick and District.
- Daphne Jean Kennard, Music Adviser, Disabled Living Foundation.
- Sheila Helena Kitzinger. For services to childbirth and parenting education.
- Kenneth Joseph Knowles, Headmaster, Canklow Woods Junior School, Rotherham.
- Joseph Landau, Member, Tyne and Wear County Council.
- Harold Alfred Lear. For services to the community in Corby.
- Stanley Leek, Engineering Manager, Asraam, Hatfield Division, Dynamics Group, British Aerospace plc.
- Helmut Karl Eduard Leopoldt, lately Senior Nursing Officer, Oxfordshire Area Health Authority.
- David Alain Le Sage, Director, Elder Park Housing Association Ltd., Glasgow.
- George Robert Lewington, Assistant Executive Engineer, North Area, London Telecommunications Region, British Telecommunications.
- John James Lewis, Deputy Director (Mining), North East Leicestershire Prospect, National Coal Board.
- Philip Martin Logan Lewis, Chairman, Southern Region, British Sports Association for the Disabled.
- James Norman Liddle, Headteacher, Bantaskin Primary School, Falkirk.
- Joan Mary Livesey, Midwifery Sister, Blackburn Health District, Lancashire Area Health Authority.
- Joan Lloyd, lately Secretary, Wiltshire Blind Association.
- William Harry Lowe, Senior Executive Officer, Department of Health and Social Security.
- Mary Ross Keith-Lucas, Organiser, Canterbury, Citizens Advice Bureau.
- Robert Knox Lyons, Sales Director, Moygashel Ltd.
- Arthur Gordon McCalla, Design Manager Naval Projects, Vickers Engineering Equipment Group, Vickers Fluid Power.
- Elizabeth Wilson McCreath, RD, Head, Education Section, Unilever plc.
- Florence Violet McDonald. For services to' the community in Kincardineshire.
- Mary Agnes McGill, Principal, Altishane Primary School, Strabane.
- Eithne Maire McGrory, Senior Executive Officer, Ports Office for Scotland, Department of Transport.
- Lieutenant-Colonel William Miller Mackay, DSO, MC, Adjutant, Royal Hospital Chelsea.
- Thomas McLaren, Senior Lecturer, Scottish Centre for the Education of the Deaf, Moray House College of Education, Edinburgh.
- Mary Elizabeth McMaster, Services Welfare Organiser, Women's Royal Voluntary Service, Princess Marina College Arborfield.
- Donald McNiven, Farmer, Machrie, Isle of Arran.
- Edward McVeigh, lately Member, Down District Council.
- Wilfred Alan Maddison, Inspector, Warwickshire Constabulary.
- James Magee, Vice-Chairman, St. Andrew's Ambulance Association.
- Norman Frederick Maggs. For services to the community in Frome.
- Patrick Maguire, Superintendent, Royal Ulster Constabulary.
- Gladys Lilian Mallinson. For services to the community in Huddersfield.
- Captain Peter Forster Manisty, DSC, Royal Navy (Retd.), Chairman, Association of Railway Preservation Societies.
- Hilary Felix Andrew Marks, Chief Economist, Meat and Livestock Commission.
- Eric Walter Marriott, Chief Development Engineer, Bentley Textile Machinery (Loughborough) Ltd.
- Dorothy Marsden, lately Director of Nurse Education, Halifax School of Nursing, Calderdale Area Health Authority.
- Dorothy Nairn Marshall, Secretary, Buteshire Natural History Society.
- Marian Mayer, Management Accountant, Vinten Group Ltd.
- Cecily Ann Measures, Clerk to the Council, London Chamber of Commerce and Industry.
- Joseph Melling, Principal Engineer, Joint Land Reclamation Team, Greater Manchester Council.
- Sarah Ruth Millward. For Political Service in Yorkshire.
- Stanley Watt Milne, Works Director, Parsons Peebles Power Transformers.
- Vera Alice Milne. For Political Service in Eastern England.
- Lieutenant Colonel John Charles Milner, TD. For Political and Public Service in the West Midlands.
- John Victor Milton, Managing Director, E. Standing Ltd., Harrogate.
- Winifred Helen Moir. For services to the community in Rochdale.
- Ronald Alexander Moore, lately Senior Executive Officer, Department for National Savings.
- Andrew Lloyd Morgan, DSC, VRD, Chairman, Lincolnshire Agricultural Wages Committee.
- Constance Morton, Senior Personal Secretary, Board of Inland Revenue.
- Granville George Mothers, Chief Inspector, Merseyside Police.
- Cornelius McCaffrey Murphy, Editor and Managing Director, Building magazine.
- Robert Murray, Works Manager, Fibres Division, Teesside Works, Imperial Chemical Industries plc.
- George Neilson, District Controller, Clyde District, HM Coastguard, Department of Trade.
- Reginald Cecil Newman, Professional and Technology Officer Grade II, Ministry of Defence.
- Jim Noble. For services to music in Cumbria.
- Steven Michael James Ovett. For services to athletics.
- Alec Thomas Walter Oxford, Deputy Director and Training Services Officer, National Youth Bureau.
- Ernest Roy Peacock, Chief Construction Engineer, Simon-Rosedowns Ltd. For services to Export.
- Freda Kathleen Pearce, President, The Freda Pearce Foundation for Cancer Care, Herefordshire.
- Elizabeth Perrins. For Political Service in Wales.
- Nora Christine Perry. For services to Badminton.
- Cecilia Mabel Pickard. For services to the community in Lancashire.
- Marjorie Hilda Pidgeon, Community Nursing Officer, Penzance.
- Dorothy Violet Plumb. For services to the Thundersley and Hadleigh Branch of the British Empire Cancer Campaign.
- John Henry Poulten, Chairman and Managing Director, John Poulten Ltd. For services to Export.
- Malcolm William Pratt, Assistant Executive Engineer, British Telecommunications Technical College.
- The Reverend James Ledingham Proudfoot, lately Chairman, Fife Region, Children's Panel Advisory Committee.
- Marjorie Frances Pugh, Administrative Secretary, Warrington and Runcorn Development Corporation.
- John Joseph Quinn, General Secretary, Bolton and District Union of Textile and Allied Workers (Spinning).
- Philip Henry Reader, lately Higher Executive Officer, Department of Employment.
- Richard Reed, Chairman, Hartlepool National Insurance Local Tribunal.
- Robin Sturrock Rennie, Chairman and Managing Director, Store Design Ltd., Dunfermline.
- John Barnes Renton, General Secretary, Scottish Prison Officers' Association.
- Eric John Richardson, Regional Export Representative, IMI Yorkshire Imperial Ltd. For services to Export.
- Stanley Henry Richardson, lately Assistant Secretary, British Dental Association.
- Walter Ridgway. For Political Service.
- Kenneth Frederick Thomas Rivers, Chief Superintendent, Metropolitan Police.
- Wilfred Roach, Higher Executive Officer, Department of Health and Social Security.
- Albert John Edward Robbins, Chief Superintendent, Metropolitan Police.
- David Roberts, Chairman, National Council of Young Men's Christian Associations of Wales.
- Mary Christian Roberts. For Political Service in South Eastern England.
- Daniel Robertson, Governor Class III, HM Prison, Edinburgh.
- Allan Robinson, County Staff Officer, Surrey Special Constabulary.
- Richard Robinson, Chief Superintendent, Royal Ulster Constabulary.
- Sylvia Georgina Robinson, Senior Personal Secretary, Board of Inland Revenue.
- Stanley Robson, lately Lecturer in Agricultural Economics, University of Newcastle.
- Arthur William John Rogers, Collector of Taxes, Board of Inland Revenue.
- Ann Marlene Round, Dental Hygienist, Brighton.
- Eileen Dora Hamley-Rowan, Secretary, East Sheen and Barnes Branch, Royal National Lifeboat Institution.
- Richard George Rowe, Manager, Brake Materials Facility, Dunlop Aviation.
- Marian West Russell, Member, Executive Committee, Royal Scottish Society for the Prevention of Cruelty to Children.
- John William Lewis Samworth. For services to Peterborough Cathedral.
- Joseph Forester Sare, BEM, Executive Officer, National Maritime Institute.
- Margaret Savage, Sister, Princes Park Hospital, Liverpool.
- Herbert William Scott, Chairman, Orkney Islands Shipping Company Ltd.
- John Joseph Ian Shanks, lately Senior Executive Officer, Ministry of Defence.
- Guy William George Sibley, lately Export Director, Invicta Hose Clips Ltd. For services to Export.
- Harold Stephen John Siford, Consultant, Disability Training Centre, British School of Motoring Ltd.
- Andrew Gordon Seviister, lately Inspector of Taxes, Board of Inland Revenue.
- Frederick George Simms, lately Editor, Biggleswade Chronicle.
- Derrick George Simpson, Headmaster, Orsett Church of England Primary School, Essex.
- Albert James Sinfield. For services to music in Cornwall.
- Edwin Albert Skinner, Senior Executive Officer, National Maritime Museum.
- Leslie James Harris Slack, Technical Director, English Abrasives Ltd.
- Barrie Smethurst, Senior Lecturer in Mathematics, Sunderland Polytechnic.
- Captain Jonathan Hew Dalrymple-Smith, Captain, Northolt Airport, Peregrine Air Services Ltd.
- William Macintosh Smith, Senior Executive Officer, Department of Employment.
- Arnold Smullen, Assistant Area Commissioner (Handicapped), Greater Glasgow Area Scout Council.
- Mary Sapphire Sole, Clerk to the Trustees, Royal Victoria Hall Benevolent Fund.
- John Ross Spence, Group Controller, Inverness Group, United Kingdom Warning and Monitoring Organisation.
- Reginald James Spencer, Manager, Quality Control and Division Chief Inspector, Rolls-Royce Motors.
- Gwendoline Ivy Doris Spillar. For services to the community in Poole, Dorset.
- Dorothy Gladys Standfast, County Secretary, Surrey Branch, British Red Cross Society.
- Gilbert Henry Standish, lately Vice Principal, Gibraltar and Dockyard Technical College, Ministry of Defence.
- Doris Catherine Love Stanfield. For services to disabled people in Northern Ireland.
- Edward George Moore Staple, Training Services Officer Grade I, Department of Employment.
- Roy Anthony Sterlini, Higher Executive Officer, Home Office.
- Joyce Mary, Lady Steward. For Political and Public Service in North Western England.
- Keith William Frederick Steward, Station Manager, Connah's Quay Power Station, Central Electricity Generating Board.
- Geoffrey Stokoe, TD, Chairman, Age Concern, Brighton.
- John Sullivan, Commercial Manager, Viper Engine Division, Rolls-Royce Ltd. For services to Export.
- John Reed Sutcliffe, Advanced Systems Group Manager, Simulators, Trainers and ATE Division, Marconi Space and Defence Systems.
- Frederick George Sutton, lately Bursar, University of Leicester.
- Alys Margaret Thomas, lately Principal Careers Officer, Powys.
- Georgina Annie Barbara Thomas, Member, Charnwood Borough Council.
- Patrick Thompson, Divisional Nursing Officer, North Wales Hospital, Denbigh.
- Walter Thomson, Rugby Correspondent, Sunday Post.
- James Edwin Torode, lately Senior Scientific Officer, Ministry of Defence.
- John Benjamin Toshack, Manager, Swansea City Association Football Club.
- Joseph Tregoning. For Political Service in Wales.
- Fred Wade, Adviser, OK Motor Services Ltd.
- Stanley Wakeman, Personnel Officer, GEC Power Engineering Ltd.
- Edward Marsden Waring. For services to Rugby League Football.
- Geoffrey Claud Waterer, DL, Member, Essex County Council.
- Joan Mary Watson. For services to the community in Cumbria.
- Ian Stuart Watt, Forest Officer Grade I, Forestry Commission.
- Samuel Hugh Weaver. For services to the blind in Wales.
- Rosemary Joan McDonnell Webb, Member, Police Authority for Northern Ireland.
- Edward John Wenham. For services to Physics Education.
- David James Westmore, Chairman, League of Friends of Wembley Hospital, Brent and Harrow Area Health Authority.
- Raymond Francis William Whitehead, Inspector (Higher Grade), Board of Inland Revenue.
- Ronald Norman Whiteley. For services to the Leonard Cheshire Foundation International Wheelchair Fund (Overseas).
- Sidney Victor Wildman, Turbine Technical Manager, APE-Allen Ltd.
- Grace Wilkes. For services to the community in the West Midlands.
- Lloyd Thomas Williams, lately Executive Officer, Department of Health and Social Security.
- Mona Goodwin Williams, lately Nursing Sister, Alder Hey Children's Hospital, Liverpool Area Health Authority.
- Kenneth Williamson, Export Sales Executive, British Aerospace Dynamics Group. For services to Export.
- Robert George Dylan Willis. For services to Cricket.
- Douglas Ernest Edward Withers, Site Manager, Walter Llewellyn & Sons Ltd.
- Alistair Mackay Wood, Chairman, Voluntary Committee for Wales, International Year of Disabled People.
- Brian Arthur Martin Wright, Secretary, Weed Research Organisation, Yarnton, Oxford.
- James Herman Wyss, Regional Sales Manager, Southern Gas Region, British Gas Corporation.
- Wan Pin Yeo, Legal Adviser, Leeds Community Relations Council.
- Lieutenant Commander Robert Douglas Mackay Youngson, VRD, lately Member, Durham County Council.
- Lily Ziegler, Metropolitan District Organiser, Wakefield, Women's Royal Voluntary Service.

Diplomatic Service and Overseas List

- Maureen Joyce Agu. For services to the British community in Vienna.
- David Jose Back. For services to the British community in Cyprus.
- Grace Mary Biffen. For nursing services to the community in Nairobi.
- Wendy Blackmur. For welfare services to children in Hong Kong.
- Theodore Theophilus Bramble, BEM. For public services in Montserrat.
- The Reverend Cyril Sinclair Butterfield. For services to the community in Bermuda.
- Islay Leonie Conolly, Chief Education Officer, Cayman Islands.
- Pamela Margaret Evelyn Currie, English Language Officer, British Council, Peru.
- Elizabeth Dannenberg. For services to British commercial interests in São Paulo.
- Bette Diana Davis, Second Secretary (Visitors Office) HM Embassy, Washington.
- Dorothy Eleanor Houssemayne Du Boulay. For services to the British community in Lisbon.
- Margaret Lillian Fiddes. For welfare services to the community in Malawi.
- Charles Francis Formby, Vice-Consul, HM Consulate, Seville.
- Frances Araminta Gonzalez, Family Care Officer, Social Security Department, Gibraltar.
- Catherine Elizabeth Lucietia Greenaway, For services to education in Montserrat.
- Bertie Basil Hall, Accommodation Officer, HM Embassy, Cape Town.
- Albert Richard Hawkins. For services to British interests in Nassau.
- John Edward Hay, Senior Inspector of Schools, Swaziland.
- Norma Huber, Vice-Consul, HM Consulate-General, Los Angeles.
- Kenneth Neil Johnson, Second Secretary (Commercial), British High Commission, Lagos.
- Walter George Devon Johnson, lately Administration Officer, United Kingdom Delegation to NATO, Brussels.
- Thomas Allan Jones, Assistant Representative, British Council, Bangladesh.
- Clifford Alfred Kelly, Third Secretary, British High Commission, Lagos.
- Tat-yan Lam, Senior Judicial Clerk, Judiciary, Hong Kong.
- Dorothy Eileen Leach, Senior Nursing Officer, Medical Department, Zambia.
- Stephen Ki Lee, Regional Commander, Civil Aid Services, Hong Kong.
- John Canvin McGeachie. For services to British commercial interests in Sydney.
- Ann Constance McGregor. For services to the British community in Kuwait.
- Moira Cameron Moore, Personal Assistant, HM Embassy, Bonn.
- Barbara McElroy Morley, MVO, lately Personal Assistant, United Kingdom Delegation to the United Nations, Vienna.
- Richard James Northern, Third Secretary, HM Embassy, Jedda.
- Camelita O'Neal, Staff Nurse, Public Health Department, British, Virgin Islands.
- Francisco de Sales Ozorio, Chief Executive Officer, Hong Kong.
- Dorothy Jean Parkes, Personal Assistant, Commercial Department, HM Embassy, Washington.
- Charles Noel Payne. For services to the British community in Buenos Aires.
- George Henry Pickering. For services to British commercial interests in Belgium.
- Harold Pickersgill. For services to Anglo-French relations in Caen.
- Phyllis Howison Powers. For services to education in Cuba.
- Charles Duncan Rae. For services to the British community in Naples.
- Nancy Read. For teaching and welfare services to children in Uganda.
- Isobel Morag Ritchie. For services to education in Sikkim, India.
- Josephine Roberts. For services to the community in Taejon, Korea.
- Venance Akakpo Sallah, Commercial Officer, HM Embassy, Dakar.
- Harry Bernard Shaw. For services to British commercial interests in Bordeaux.
- Bruce Alexander Shapiro. For services to British commercial and community interests in Genoa.
- Annie Marie Stahle, lately Honorary British Consul, Puerto Barrios, Guatemala.
- Marion Agatha Stevens. For services to the community in St. Kitts-Nevis.
- Susannah Storm-Turner, Senior Personal Secretary, British High Commission, New Delhi.
- Dennis Alan Taylor, for services to the British community in Buenos Aires.
- Ronald George Tippett, Second Secretary (Administration), British High Commission, Georgetown.
- T.H. Tse. For public and community services in Hong Kong.
- Myles Ian Maitland Turner, lately Wildlife Manager, Nyika National Park, Malawi.
- William Joseph Anthony Turner, lately Commercial Officer, British High Commission, Wellington.
- Brenda Doreen Erica Weigelt. For services to the British community in Chicago.
- Ashe Windham, Commercial Assistant, HM Consulate-General, Stuttgart.
- Tak-hing Kwan, Hong Kong martial artist and actor, best known for portrayal of folk hero Wong Fei-hung.

Australian States

State of Victoria

- Pericival James Stanley Bentley. For service to Australian football administration.
- Ronald Patrick Casey. For service to sports journalism.
- Peter Robert Demaine. For service to industry.
- Cecil James Evans. For service to golf.
- Leonard Allan Falk. For service to education.
- Thomas Stanley Raymond Hafey. For service to Australian football.
- Kevin Alexander Hall. For public service.
- Kenneth William David Jack. For service to the arts.
- Florence Jean Kendall. For service to pre-school education.
- Councillor Gordon Sutcliffe Liddle. For municipal service.
- Basil Mervyn Moss. For service to education.
- Colin Alexander Craigen Murray. For community service.
- Lorna Marjorie Pescott. For service to the deaf.
- Joan Andrea Tuxen. For service to disabled persons.

State of Queensland

- Kathleen Gertrude Atherton. For services to teaching and sport.
- Reverend Gerald Thomas Fitzgerald. For service to the Church and community.
- Doris Madeline Kenny. For services to the Queensland Country Women's Association.
- Lillian Ada Ruby Noakes. For services to the city of Mount Isa.
- Adrian Scott. For services to rural industry and radio.
- Eleanor Jane Stirling. For service to the community.
- Councillor Jack Tonkin. For service to local government.
- Harriet Marian Bridson Walker. For services to the legal profession and the community.

State of South Australia

- Herbert Phillips Clarkson. For services to the community.
- Patricia Kaufmann. For services to mentally disabled young people.
- Brian Attiwill Magarey. For services to the legal profession.
- Jack Stuart McKnight. For services to the blind.
- The Very Reverend Dean Louis Michael Travers. For services to the community.

State of Western Australia

- Roy William Abbott. For services to cricket.
- Lorna Olive Cooper. For service to the Girl Guide movement.
- Bernice Veronica Down. For public service.
- Brian Vincent Johnson, Private Secretary to the Premier.
- Winifred Joan Tonkin. For service to the community.

=== Order of the Companions of Honour (CH) ===
- Dame Ninette de Valois, DBE. For services to the ballet.

=== Companion of the Imperial Service Order (ISO) ===
Home Civil Service

- Jack Albert Atfield, Senior Principal, Home Office.
- Richard Dennis Henry Baker, lately Senior Principal, Civil Service Department.
- James Barrie, Inspector, Board of Inland Revenue.
- Dennis Frederick Blazye, Principal, Ministry of Defence.
- William Joseph Boyle, lately Superintending Estate Surveyor, Department of the Environment.
- Sydney Handel Bristow, Senior Principal, Department of Transport.
- Iris Lilian Laura Brooker, Assistant Master, Court of Protection.
- Brian Wilson Collins, Foreign and Commonwealth Office.
- Alick Arthur Cushion, lately Senior Principal, Office of Population Censuses and Surveys.
- Edward Douglas, Senior Principal Scientific Officer, Warren Spring Laboratory.
- Albert John Eades, lately Principal, Department of Employment.
- Marion Black Farquhar, lately Principal, Scottish Office.
- Patrick Claude Fry, Senior Principal, Department of Industry.
- Bernard Hagel, lately Senior Principal, Ministry of Agriculture, Fisheries and Food.
- Glenys Rosemary Hembry, Chief Information Officer (B), Central Office of Information.
- Henry Valance Hempleman, Senior Principal Scientific Officer, Ministry of Defence.
- Raymond George Hicks, Principal, Welsh Office.
- James Herbert Lett, Assistant Principal, Inspector of Accidents (Engineering), Department of Trade.
- Gwyn Ivor Lewis, Principal Collector, Board of Inland Revenue.
- Charles Alexander McIlwrath, Chief Auditor, Exchequer and Audit Department, Northern Ireland.
- Geoffrey Morley, Principal Collector of Taxes, Board of Inland Revenue.
- Ronald Arthur Roberts, Assistant Director (Engineer), Ministry of Defence.
- Colin Smith, Principal Collector of Taxes, Board of Inland Revenue.
- David Smith, Inspector of Taxes, Board of Inland Revenue.
- Bernard Robert Matthew Thompson, Senior Principal, Ministry of Defence.

Diplomatic Service and Overseas List

- Maurice Kenneth Lane, QFSM, CPM, Deputy Director of Fire Services, Hong Kong.
- David Huo-fu Lin, Assistant Commissioner for Labour, Hong Kong.
- Connie Sau-ha Mok Soo, Assistant Commissioner for Labour, Hong Kong.
- Dr. Chen-ta Wong, Deputy Director, Agriculture and Fisheries Department, Hong Kong.

Australian States

State of Queensland

- Colin Roy Douglas. For public service.

State of South Australia

- Norman Benjamin Lewis. For public service to forestry.

State of Western Australia

- Alan Elliott Tonks, Auditor-General.

=== British Empire Medal (BEM) ===
Military Division

Royal Navy

- Air Engineering Artificer (M)1 Trevor Graham Cobbett Armstrong, F969619G.
- Chief Petty Officer (OPS)(R) Colin Eric Barrett, D072983D.
- Chief Petty Officer (Seaman) James Alan Bell, J956851U.
- Chief Petty Officer Sydney William John Bishop, VD983999E, Royal Naval Reserve.
- Chief Marine Engineering Mechanic (M) John Bucknall, D066388G.
- Chief Marine Engineering Mechanician (M) Leslie Charles Catlin, D051665K.
- Chief Wren Regulator Sylvia Anne McQueen Coutts, W951488L, Women's Royal Naval Reserve.
- Chief Petty Officer (Seaman) David Faulkner Creasy, QD982449F, Royal Naval Reserve.
- Colour Sergeant Brian John Darch, PO18152E, Royal Marines.
- Acting Chief Petty Officer Medical Assistant William John Davis, D071526E.
- Chief Petty Officer (OPS)(M) Daniel Robert Flower, J607790F.
- Chief Air Engineering Mechanician (M) Terence Godber, D181145R.
- Chief Petty Officer (MW) John Falconer Graham, BD986751B, Royal Naval Reserve.
- Chief Radio Supervisor (RCI) John Neville Hilder, J795714A.
- Chief Radio Supervisor (SM) John Michael Lancaster, D072707S.
- Chief Marine Engineering Mechanic (M) William Kennedy McLelland, K973373A.
- Acting Chief Radio Supervisor Alan Neil Murchie, D078487T.
- Chief Marine Engineering Mechanic (M) John Nightingale, D159846G.
- Air Engineering Artificer (R)1 Ernest Alfred Aylward Pocock, F967048S.
- Colour Sergeant Arwyn Rees, PO17118N, Royal Marines.
- Chief Petty Officer (OPS)(M) Michael Barry Salmon, J979278H.
- Sergeant Alexander Dale Thompson, Royal Marines, PO20034X.
- Chief Petty Officer Cook Allen Charles Vincer, D053846S.
- Chief Cook George Sydney West, Royal Fleet Auxiliary.

Army

- 21154870 Staff Sergeant (Acting Warrant Officer Class 1) Ajiman Gurung, 2nd King Edward VII's Own Gurkha Rifles (The Sirmoor Rifles).
- 21160139 Corporal (Acting Sergeant) Amber Tamang, 2nd King Edward VII's Own Gurkha Rifles (The Sirmoor Rifles).
- 23865327 Staff Sergeant Robert Charles Bain, Coldstream Guards.
- 24052666 Staff Sergeant Jeffrey Baker, Royal Corps of Transport.
- LS/01157811 Sergeant (Acting Staff Sergeant) Derrick George Bear, Royal Regiment of Artillery.
- 21155994 Staff Sergeant (Acting Warrant Officer Class 2) Chewang Norbhu Lama, 2nd King Edward VII's Own Gurkha Rifles (The Sirmoor Rifles).
- 24124657 Staff Sergeant Derek Colin Cleeton, Royal Corps of Transport.
- 24087392 Staff Sergeant John Bernard Connolly, Royal Corps of Signals.
- 23509254 Sergeant (Acting Staff Sergeant) David William Cousins, Grenadier Guards.
- 24011618 Sergeant (Acting Staff Sergeant) Denis Crawford, Royal Regiment of Artillery.
- 22339692 Sergeant Dennis Doubleday, Corps of Royal Electrical and Mechanical Engineers, Territorial Army.
- 23878515 Sergeant Seci Drika, Royal Corps of Signals.
- 23559880 Sergeant Herbert Walter Durkin, The King's Regiment.
- 23473959 Sergeant Ian Durrant, Royal Corps of Signals.
- LS/22837712 Staff Sergeant Ronald Frederick Eldridge, Royal Regiment of Artillery.
- 23949561 Sergeant Ivor Anthony Emberton, Royal Corps of Transport.
- 23890617 Sergeant Alan Edward Forrow, Royal Corps of Transport.
- 23651056 Sergeant William Fraser, The Royal Irish Rangers (27th Inniskilling) 83rd and 87th) (now Discharged).
- 23945929 Staff Sergeant Garyth Stephen George, The Light Infantry.
- 22835706 Sergeant James Gray, Royal Corps of Transport, Territorial Army (now Discharged).
- 23982403 Sergeant Robert Alan Hadlow, Corps of Royal Electrical and Mechanical Engineers.
- 23733542 Staff Sergeant Keith Donald Harris, Royal Corps of Signals.
- 24030777 Staff Sergeant Nigel Hugh Hastie, Royal Corps of Signals.
- 23708239 Sergeant Henry Hetherington, Royal Corps of Signals.
- 23547727 Staff Sergeant (Acting Warrant Officer Class 2) Ronald John Hickton, Corps of Royal Engineers.
- 23846766 Staff Sergeant Richard Andrew Hill, Royal Army Ordnance Corps.
- 23982825 Staff Sergeant Malcolm Hirst, The Duke of Wellington's Regiment (West Riding).
- 24078851 Staff Sergeant Timothy John Hoare, The Duke of Edinburgh's Royal Regiment (Berkshire and Wiltshire).
- 23807025 Staff Sergeant John Hooper, Royal Army Ordnance Corps.
- 23955268 Staff Sergeant Christopher Jeffery, Royal Tank Regiment.
- 23969791 Staff Sergeant Henry David Kirkpatrick, Irish Guards.
- 24092797 Staff Sergeant Ian Herbert Laing, Royal Army Ordnance Corps.
- 22566172 Corporal Kenneth Ellis Lightowlers, The Queen's Regiment, Territorial Army.
- 23238281 Corporal John William Lovatt, The Staffordshire Regiment (The Prince of Wales's).
- 21158921 Staff Sergeant (Acting Warrant Officer Class 2) Magankumar Chhetri, 2nd King Edward VII's Own Gurkha Rifles (The Sirmoor Rifles).
- 24222421 Sergeant David McNulty, Intelligence Corps.
- 23888282 Staff Sergeant John McQueenie, Royal Regiment of Artillery.
- W/459244 Lance Corporal (Acting Corporal) Evelyn Rose Milne, Women's Royal Army Corps.
- 24336455 Lance Corporal (Acting Corporal) Malcolm James Mill Ward, The Queen's Regiment.
- 24119570 Staff Sergeant Michael Moran, Royal Army Ordnance Corps.
- 24008216 Staff Sergeant Joseph Walter Nelson, Corps of Royal Engineers.
- 23784646 Staff Sergeant Barrington Arthur Newman, Corps of Royal Electrical and Mechanical Engineers.
- 23396141 Sergeant John Daniel Nicholls, Royal Corps of Signals.
- 24364944 Corporal Matthew Joseph O'Toole, Royal Pioneer Corps.
- 23832335 Sergeant (Acting Staff Sergeant) James Paris, Queen's Own Highlanders (Seaforth and Camerons).
- 24137792 Staff Sergeant Stephen Christopher Parnell, Royal Army Pay Corps.
- 24322033 Corporal Charles Henry Potts, Royal Army Ordnance Corps.
- 24034267 Corporal Danny Pratt, Royal Corps of Transport.
- 23881610 Staff Sergeant Brian James Reid, Royal Army Ordnance Corps.
- 23962416 Lance Corporal Andrew Stoner, Corps of Royal Engineers.
- 24091843 Staff Sergeant William John Tennent, Corps of Royal Military Police.
- 24108204 Corporal Brian Albert Thorniley, Corps of Royal Engineers.
- 24104950 Staff Sergeant John Edward Tombling, The Queen's Regiment.
- 22628131 Sergeant (Local Staff Sergeant) Derek Arthur Walters, Royal Corps of Transport.
- 24006817 Staff Sergeant Laurence Wardell, Royal Army Ordnance Corps.
- 23352945 Staff Sergeant Peter Raymond Widdowson, The Parachute Regiment.
- 23937608 Sergeant Michael James Winwood, The Light Infantry.
- 24066995 Staff Sergeant (Acting Warrant Officer Class 2) Michael Arthur Wood, Corps' of Royal Engineers.
- 23920728 Staff Sergeant Keith Yallop, Corps of Royal Military Police.

Royal Air Force

- R4275468 Flight Sergeant David Allon.
- K4131119 Flight Sergeant George Rendall Denny.
- U0681550 Flight Sergeant Terry Henry Earley.
- J4075202 Flight Sergeant John Gildus England.
- M4264525 Flight Sergeant (now Warrant Officer) Arthur Keith Laverack.
- Y0594187 Flight Sergeant Thomas John McClurg.
- T3518121 Flight Sergeant John Matthews.
- D4253551 Flight Sergeant John Morrison.
- X0588300 Flight Sergeant Frederick William Newton.
- T1961743 Flight Sergeant Nigel Richards.
- X4026118 Flight Sergeant John Rutter.
- H1941660 Flight Sergeant Alexander Murray Simpson.
- R1941273 Chief Technician Keith Roy Biddles.
- T3528843 Chief Technician John Hancock.
- W1924443 Chief Technician Brian William Reeves.
- K3063336 Chief Technician Harry Richard Robey.
- X0593395 Sergeant Graham Barry Hurst.
- N4172508 Sergeant Kenneth William Henry Huxtable.
- H1946277 Sergeant John Roger Marsland.
- B4185119 Sergeant Gwilym Arthur Owen.
- K4265743 Corporal Soodursan Chinegadoo.
- SI950543 Corporal John Edward Hutchings.

Civil Division
United Kingdom

- Andrew Aitken, Principal Officer, HM Prison and Young Offenders Institution, Dumfries.
- Frederick George Allcock, Distribution Maintenance Technician, East Midlands Region, British Gas Corporation.
- John Charles Ambrose, Quality Manager, Teddington Industrial Equipment Ltd.
- Ian Haddon Anderson, Shore Superintendent, Lerwick Harbour Trust.
- Kenneth Frederick Archer, lately Leading Observer, No. 12 Group, Bristol Sector Control, Royal Observer Corps.
- John Bannister, Area Salvage Team Overman, North Derbyshire Area, National Coal Board.
- George Albert Barlow, Locomotive Master, Romney, Hythe and Dymchurch Railway.
- Winifred Beasley, Emergency Services Officer, Altrincham, Women's Royal Voluntary Service.
- Frederick Albert Charles Belcher. For services to the National Association of Boys' Clubs.
- William Bell, lately Fitter, Philadelphia Workshops, North East Area, National Coal Board.
- Samuel Ernest Hooper-Bennett, Dockgate Foreman, British Transport Docks Board.
- Mary Berry. For services to the Women's Royal Voluntary Service in Great Harwood, Lancashire.
- Stanley Wyndham Bevan. For services to the community in Bridgend, Mid-Glamorgan.
- George Henderson Beveridge, Foreman Inspector, Andrew Chalmers & Mitchell Ltd., Glasgow.
- James Alphonsus Kiran Black, Coastguard Officer, HM Coastguard, Department of Trade.
- Eirwen Bound, Head Cook, Staff Restaurant, Government Building, Trawsgoed, near Aberystwyth.
- William Henry Bowers, Chief Officer Class II, Northern Ireland Prison Service.
- George Herbert Boyce. For services to the St. John Ambulance Brigade in Derby.
- Francis Brazukas, Blast Furnace Keeper, Redcar Works, British Steel Corporation.
- John Stanley James Brewer, Chief Petty Officer Instructor, Bristol TS Filton Unit, Sea Cadet Corps.
- Kenneth Maxwell Brierley, Weaving Manager, Celairic Ltd., Huddersfield.
- Florinda Brooks, Sub-Postmistress, Bettws Newydd Sub-Post Office, Wales and The Marches Postal Region, The Post Office.
- Mary Ellis Brooks. For services to the Tynemouth Hospitals' League of Friends, North Tyneside Area Health Authority.
- Elizabeth Robertson Brown. For services to pipe music in Banchory.
- Harold Jack Brown, Canteen Manager, HM Ships, Navy, Army and Air Force Institutes.
- John William Buckingham, Chief Inspector's Assistant, Hatfield Division, Dynamics Group, British Aerospace plc.
- Marjorie Buckley, District Hospital Organiser, Chichester, Women's Royal Voluntary Service.
- Mary Theresa Bunyan, Security Officer IV, Department of Industry.
- John William Archibald Burrows, Specialist Sewerman/Specialist Roadman/Heavy Driver/ Plant Operator, Borough of Redditch.
- Harry Reginald Bye, Cleansing Supervisor, Braughing Rural District Council.
- Margaret Ellen Calcott, lately Telephone Operator, Guildhall Offices, Shrewsbury Borough Council.
- William Griffiths Gale, Chief Observer, No. 13 Group South Wales, Royal Observer Corps.
- Harry George Cambridge, Foreman Steel Sheet Metal Worker, Pye Unicam Ltd.
- David John Caruth, Chief Steward, Shell Tankers (UK) Ltd.
- George Hollis Clarke, Professional and Technology Officer III, Materials Physics Division, Atomic Energy Research Establishment, Harwell.
- James Leo Clarke, Overlooker I, Ministry of Defence.
- Joan Evelyn Clyde, lately Staff Restaurant Supervisor, Eastern Electricity Board.
- George Cole, River Inspector, Tees and Hartlepool Port Authority.
- John William Collishaw, Chief Steward II, RAF College, Cranwell, Ministry of Defence.
- Harold Robert Cook, lately Photoprinter I, Ministry of Defence.
- Reginald Claud Cook, Foreman, EMI Electronics Ltd., Hayes.
- Michael John William Cooley, Constable, Metropolitan Police.
- Marian Esther Couchman, Head Gardener, Westminster Abbey.
- Brian Francis Cramp, Constable, City of London Police.
- Kenneth Crawford, Detective Constable, Royal Ulster Constabulary.
- William George Cruze, Station Supervisor (Parcels), Victoria, Central Division, Southern Region, British Rail.
- Tom Andrew Cumberland, Constable, Ministry of Defence Police.
- Samuel Maurice Dale, Packaging Control Supervisor, Rolls-Royce Ltd., Leavesden.
- Ralph Dean, lately Farm Manager, Grassland Research Institute, Maidenhead.
- Ian Donald, Leading Ambulanceman, Elgin, Scottish Ambulance Service.
- John Mitchell Dotchin, Chief Quality Inspector, Hardy Bros (Alnwick) Ltd. For services to Export.
- Mildred Dugan, Telephonist, Northern Ireland Electricity Service.
- Marion Joan Ecclestone, Meals on Wheels Organiser, Devon County, Women's Royal Voluntary Service.
- Donald Edgar, Works Convenor, Dunlop plc (Hydraulics Division), T.V.T.E., Gateshead.
- Charles Jack Edwards, Fitter, Fire Service Staff College, Dorking, Home Office.
- Gordon Victor Eley, Supervisor, Carpenters Shop, L.P. Foreman & Sons, Ltd.
- Phyllis Jane Ellis, Chief Publication Saleswoman, Hampton Court Palace, Department of the Environment.
- Douglas Elphinstone, Gardener, Dr. Guthrie's Boys' (List D) School, Edinburgh.
- Jean Mary Ensor, Centre Organiser, Ormskirk, Lancashire, British Red Cross Society.
- John Evans, lately Process and General Supervisory Grade "B", Ministry of Defence.
- Arthur William Everett, Night Watchman (Industrial), Herbarium and Library, Royal Botanic Gardens, Kew.
- Frederick Fallon, Foreign and Commonwealth Office.
- Audrey Mary Fallows, Process and General Supervisory Grade "D", Ministry of Defence.
- Geoffrey Farrar, Constable, West Yorkshire Metropolitan Police.
- Frank Field, Foreman, Moss Bay Works, Cumbria, British Steel Corporation.
- George Field, Plumber/Welder, Steels Engineering Ltd., Sunderland.
- George Gummerson Fisher, Caretaker, Retford Territorial Army Centre, East Midlands, Territorial Army Volunteer Reserve Association.
- Eddie Ronald Fletcher, Labour Master, The Mercantile Lighterage Company Ltd.
- David Walter Foster, Constable, Devon and Cornwall Constabulary.
- Mary Fraser, Estate Secretary, Balcarres Estate, Colinsburgh, Fife.
- Thomas Leonard Freer, Lord Mayor's Attendant, City of Birmingham.
- John Thomas Coggin Frost, lately Stores Officer Grade "D", Ministry of Defence.
- Alfred Edwin Gallie. For services to sport in Oxfordshire.
- James Gault, Service Engineer, Central and Northern Area, Scottish Region, British Gas Corporation.
- John Goldrich, Foreign and Commonwealth Office.
- Robert Goodison, Machine Operator, Richd. W. Carr & Company Ltd.
- John Graham, Welder, British Nuclear Fuels Ltd., Sellafield.
- Jesse Griffiths, Editor, Company Newspaper, Marconi Avionics Ltd.
- James William Haire, Cleaning Supervisor, Northern Ireland Housing Executive.
- Lily Hall, Housemaid, House of Lords.
- Arthur Eric Harding, Driver, Crewe, British Rail.
- Francis Maurice Harding, Divisional Superintendent, Buckinghamshire, St. John Ambulance Brigade.
- Leslie James Harman, Foreman Bookbinder (Industrial Grade), Board of Inland Revenue.
- James Harper, Wharfman Weighman/Clerk, Welland Fuels Ltd., Leicester.
- Walter James Harris, Professional and Technology Officer Grade 4, Ministry of Defence.
- Donald Grendon Harrison. For services to the fishing industry, particularly in the Morecambe Bay area.
- Walter Paterson Harvey, Foreman of Transport, Directorate of Scottish Services, Department of the Environment.
- Robin Phillip Hayden, Process and General Supervisory Grade E, Ministry of Defence.
- Harold Hayes, Chief Officer I, HM Prison Leeds.
- Lindley Hayes, Dairy Supervisor, Lincoln Co-operative Society.
- Dulcie Mary Heald, Local Organiser, Barry, South Glamorgan, Women's Royal Voluntary Service.
- Stanley Henshall, Industrial Experimental Gardener I, Ministry of Agriculture, Fisheries and Food.
- Edward Higgins, Sub-Officer, Hampshire Fire Brigade.
- Constance Margaret Hill, Supervisor, Telephone Exchange, Lucas Batteries Ltd. For services to Export.
- William Edward Hill. For services to the Reform Club.
- Elsie Louise Hillier, Sub-Postmistress, Combe Hay Sub-Post Office, The Post Office.
- Sidney Hinton. For services to the 1st Silverstone Company, Boys Brigade.
- Jane Hudson Hitchcock. For services to the community in Stowmarket, Suffolk.
- Leonard James Hoffman, Youth Leader, London Borough of Newham.
- Arthur Norman Lionel Holland, Instructional Officer Grade 2 Driving, Royal Military Police Training Centre, Ministry of Defence.
- Dennis Albert Holmes, Parks Superintendent, Minehead.
- Derek William Holmes, Linesman, Midlands Electricity Board.
- Douglas Hood, Ferryman, Islandmagee/Larne Ferry.
- Richard Hopkins, Constable, Kent Constabulary.
- James Graham Hossack, Chief Petty Officer, FPV Norna, Department of Agriculture and Fisheries for Scotland.
- Frederick Herbert Houlton, Leather-worker, Charles A. Blatchford & Sons Ltd., Basingstoke.
- Ronald Henry House, Facilities Manager, Bisham Abbey National Sports Centre.
- Douglas Lionel Howard, Appeals Organiser, Gwent, Royal National Institute for the Blind.
- Arthur Thomas Humphreys, Yard Chargehand, West Midlands County Council.
- Donald William James, Sub-Officer, Hereford and Worcester Fire Brigade.
- George Johnson, Sub-Officer, Wiltshire Fire Brigade.
- Frances Marjorie Joice, Registry Supervisor, Head Office, Soldiers', Sailors' and Airmen's Families Association.
- Hugh Richard Jones, lately Custodian and Technical Assistant, North Wales Quarry Museum.
- James Jones, Crane Driver, Hamiltons (Cardiff) Works, BSC Forges, Foundry and Engineering, British Steel Corporation.
- Thomas George Jones, School Keeper, Beverley Primary School for the Deaf and the James Wolfe Schools, London.
- Harold Jopling, Foreman, Yard Staff, Durham Cathedral.
- Ronald Jordan, lately Messenger, Department of Health and Social Security.
- James Louis King, Driver, University of Manchester.
- Thomas Edwin Kirkham, Class I Heavy Goods Vehicle Driver, Goodier & Sons Ltd.
- Frank Harold Lane, Cleaner, Metropolitan Police.
- Marjorie Lathe. For services to the community in Wolverhampton.
- Trevor James Laws, Constable, Staffordshire Police.
- Norman Legge. For services to the Royal British Legion in Northern Ireland.
- Albert Leslie Lewis, Petty Officer, Cunard Steamship Company Ltd.
- Dennis Light, Assistant Shop Foreman, Beverley Engineering Ltd. For services to Export.
- Ronald Charles George Lilley, Constable, Metropolitan Police.
- Edward Dennis Lindup, lately Head Gardener, Packwood House, Warwickshire, The National Trust.
- Margaret Mabel Ann Luly, Catering Manageress Grade 4, Ministry of Defence.
- Elsie May McCambridge, Emergency Services Organiser, Cumbria, Women's Royal Voluntary Service.
- Annie Macarthur, lately Sub-Postmistress, Strontian, Argyll, The Post Office.
- James Albert Peter McCullock, Chief Officer II, HM Prison Channings Wood.
- James McGill, Groundsman I, HMS Caledonia, Ministry of Defence.
- Martha McGillivray. For services to the community, particularly to the Bellshill Maternity Hospital.
- Charles McGrath, Blacksmith, Department of Agriculture, Northern Ireland.
- David Willianr McHale, lately Racecourse Foreman, Redcar Race Company.
- William McKinley, Sub-Officer, Fire Authority for Northern Ireland.
- Allistair Douglas McLean, Technical Sales Engineer, Firth Brown Tools Ltd.
- Mabel McNaught. For services to the community in Walton, Liverpool.
- Daniel Anthony MAcNeill, Technician, Scottish Region, British Rail.
- John McNulty, Ambulance Controller, Northern Ireland Ambulance Service.
- Edmund McQuaker, General Works Superintendent, Delta Marine Ltd.
- James Elsom Major, Postman, Owston Ferry, North Eastern Postal Region, The Post Office.
- James Howard Mankee, Mine Captain, South Crofty Ltd.
- Henry Kenneth Martin. For services to the National Association of Boys' Clubs in North Shields.
- George Matthews, Shift Manager, Plate Department, Horsell Graphic Industries. Ltd.
- Joseph William Mills, lately Milk Roundsman, Express Dairies Ltd., West Wickham, Kent.
- James Milne, Constable, Merseyside Pofcce.
- Robert Munro Minshull, Superintendent, Distribution Water Service, Department of the Environment, Northern Ireland.
- Herbert Mountain, Sub-Officer, Helmsley Fire Station, North Yorkshire Fire Brigade.
- Jack Henry William Mower, Supervisor, Composing Department, Remploy Ltd., Manchester.
- William Alfred Naisbitt, Oil Movements Superintendent, Sullom Voe, BP Petroleum Development (U.K.) Ltd.
- Harold Nash, Divisional Officer, Greater London (Prince of Wales' District), St. John Ambulance Brigade.
- Francis John Nettleship, Driver I, Government Car Service, Department of the Environment.
- Peter John New, Sub-Officer, Kent Fire Brigade.
- Ellen Mary Newell, For services to visually disabled people in Newham, London.
- William James Newman, Setter, Thorn Lighting Ltd., Merthyr Tydfil.
- Raymond Noddle, Constable, Lancashire Constabulary.
- Hannah Phillips Norrie, Senior Telephonist, Ministry of Defence.
- Edgar Philip George Orgill, lately Deputy, Rufford Colliery, North Nottinghamshire Area, National Coal Board.
- Jack Leonard Osborne, Divisional Officer, Metropolitan Special Constabulary.
- Harold Robert Partridge, lately Craftsman I, Ministry of Defence.
- Trevor Robert William Payne, Professional and Technology Officer Grade III, Ministry of Defence.
- Morien Peters, Manager, Families Shop, RAF St. Athan, Navy, Army and Air Force Institutes.
- Constance Margaret Philipson. For services to the community in Preston, Lancashire.
- Thomas Joseph Powderley, Refrigeration Mechanic, Department of the Environment.
- Gladys Gildersleve Powell. For services to the community in Winchester.
- Edward Haines Prideaux, Foreman (F.3) (Engineering), Yorkshire Electricity Board.
- William Thomas Prbdmore, Pipe Fitter, Unit Superheater and Pipe Company, BSC Tubes, British Steel Corporation.
- John Pring, Supervisor (Roofing), Hall & Company Ltd.
- George Proctor, Engineer I, HM Prison Reading.
- Arthur Norman Quillin, Coxswain-Mechanic, Port St. Mary Lifeboat, Royal National Lifeboat Institution.
- Gerald Laurence Quinn, Foreign and Commonwealth Office.
- Haswell Rae, Sergeant, Grampian Police.
- Josephine Patricia Redding, Telephone Supervisor, Independent Television News.
- Charles Thomas Reynolds, Factory Technician, Procurement Executive, British Telecommunications.
- Cyril Roberts, Service Engineer, Wales Region, British Gas Corporation.
- Dennis Robinson, Constable, Durham Constabulary.
- James Rodgers, Sergeant, Royal Ulster Constabulary.
- Rachel Rogers, Storekeeper, Ministry of Defence.
- Ronald James Sanders, Quality Superintendent, Britool Ltd.
- Edwin Raymond Schuck, Sergeant, West Midlands Police.
- Richard Somes Seabrook, Contract Sheep Shearer and Shepherd, Suffolk.
- Bernard Shanley, Process and General Supervisory Grade E, Ministry of Defence.
- Iris Christine Sheasby, Typist/Telephonist/Receptionist, Rugby Portland Cement Company Ltd.
- James Richard Frederick Shepherd, Foreman (Non-Craft), Department of the Environment.
- Gwenda Olive Shields, Map Curator, Survey and Cartography, Exploration and Production, BP Petroleum Development (Overseas) Ltd.
- Frank Arthur Ernest Shonfeld, Secretary, 4th Battalion, Queen's Royal Regiment Old Comrades Association.
- Bhagat Singh, lately Sub-Inspector, Army Depot Police, BFPO I, Ministry of Defence.
- Reginald Francis Skerry, Foreman Mechanical Fitter, Matthews Hall Engineering Ltd.
- Alexander Smiley, Constable, Royal Ulster Constabulary.
- Leslie Eugene Smith, Highways Superintendent, Northamptonshire County Council.
- Eric Spencer, Fitter/Progress Chaser, APV Mitchell Dryer Ltd., Carlisle.
- Lottie Ellen Spencer, Auxiliary Nurse, Northampton General Hospital, Northamptonshire Area Health Authority.
- John Hindmarsh Spoor, Foreman Plater, Vickers Shipbuilding and Engineering Ltd.
- Gerald Downing Springthorpe, Head Ranger, Forestry Commission.
- George Stewart, Welfare and Tour Inspector, Scottish Omnibuses Ltd.
- Hugh Stewart, Building Foreman, Ulster Folk and Transport Museum.
- Howard Ramsey Stilwell, Chauffeur, ICL plc.
- William Henry Stone, Stone Mason, Perridge Estate, Longdown, Exeter.
- Constance Mary Taylor, Shorthand Typist, Export Department, Hield Bros Ltd. For services to Export.
- Alfredo Carmelo Testa, Ship's Carpenter, Trinity House Vessel Patricia.
- Glyndwr Thomas, Mill Chargehand, Remploy Ltd., Swansea.
- Alan Edward Thompson, Special Development Fitter, Vinten Group Ltd.
- Margaret Renee Tidy, Centre Organiser/ Commandant, Tunbridge Wells Centre, Kent Branch, British Red Cross Society.
- Sidney Tout, Postal Executive D, Evesham SSO, Worcester Head Office Area, Midlands Postal Board, The Post Office.
- James Albert Trott, Fitting Shop Foreman, Research and Development Division, Hunting Engineering Ltd.
- Frederick Ernest Charles Trowse, Senior Foreman, HM Stationery Office.
- Albert G. Turner, lately Chief Technician, The Museum of English Rural Life, University of Reading.
- Frank William Walker, Civilian Instructor, Llandudno and District Unit, Sea Cadet Corps.
- Henry Edward Walker, Messenger, Greater London Council.
- Horace Walker, Senior Foreman, Midland Bright Drawn Steel Ltd.
- Herbert Edward Wallace, Craftsman (Industrial Class), Institute of Geological Sciences.
- Gordon Ward, Assistant to Colliery Personnel Manager, Bentley Colliery, Doncaster, National Coal Board.
- Robert Henry Warren, Maintenance Craftsman I, South Anglia Area, Eastern Region, British Gas Corporation.
- Mary Nora Watts, Secretary/Treasurer, Warwickshire Branch, Fire Service National Benevolent Fund.
- John Hume Weatherburn, Sergeant-at-Mace, Berwick-upon-Tweed Borough Council.
- Joan Irene Wells, Foster Parent, Cheshire County Council.
- David White, Professional and Technology Officer III, Ministry of Defence.
- Ethel Joan White, Switchboard Operator, Department of Employment.
- Amos Williams, Constable, North Wales Police.
- Delmore Williams, Chargehand Craftsman (Overhead Lines), South Western Electricity Board.
- Stanley Wilson, Chef, Cheshire Constabulary.
- Frederick Henry Woodburn, Assistant to Finishing Manager, James Cropper plc, Paper Manufacturers, Kendal.
- David John Woolley, Mechanical Instructor, Haden Young Ltd.
- Florence Rhoda Worboys, Postwoman, Baldock, Hertfordshire. The Post Office.
- Albert Victor Wright. For services to scouting in Farnham, Surrey.
- Mary Ann Wright. For services to the community, particularly to the elderly, in Annan.
- William McVea Young. For services to physically disabled children and young adults in Northern Ireland.

Overseas Territories

- Chan, Pui-lam, Supervisor, Auxiliary Medical Service Group, Hong Kong.
- Fredance Robert Ebanks, Sergeant of Police, Cayman Islands Police Force.
- Rosina Julia Grada, Senior Clerical Officer, Education Department, Gibraltar.
- Brenda Doreen McCormack, Senior Confidential Secretary, Civil Service Examinations Unit, Hong Kong.
- Pun, Man-king, Inspector of Police (Band Master), Royal Hong Kong Police Force.
- Siu, Kit-wah, Head Chef, Government House, Hong Kong.
- James Victor Vinales, Supervisory Officer, Financial and Development Department, Gibraltar.
- Catherine Sarah Lucena Wade, Nursing Sister, Medical Department, Montserrat.
- Wong, Chee-ming, Senior Clerical Officer, Registrar of Shipping, Hong Kong.
- Yip Tang Betty Lock-yue, Senior Personal Secretary, Audit Department, Hong Kong.

Australian States

State of Victoria

- Margaret Winsome Barr. For service to the Girl Guide movement.
- James Joshua Blake. For service to journalism.
- Stanley Sidney Charles Blanks. For service to the Royal Life-Saving Society of Australia.
- Frank Ernest Common. For community service.
- William Dalkeith Davidson. For service to ex-servicemen.
- Mary Ellen Gilmour. For community service.
- Anna Sophie Gross. For community service.
- Donald Bernard Hawley. For public service.
- Reverend Thomas Charles Heathwood. For community service.
- Rita Rosa Kirwin. For community service.
- Mary Patricia Lawn. For public service.
- Francis Rowland McGuire. For service to athletics.
- Herbert Stanley Matthews. For public service.
- Thomas William Osborne. For service to swimming.
- Florence Lilian Parnaby. For community service.
- Beryl Nancy Pitt. For community service.
- William James Russell. For service to golf.
- Edwin Charles Semmens. For public service.
- Clark David Sinclair. For service to broadcasting.
- Pearl Margaret Stevens. For service to the Royal Life Saving Society of Australia.
- Irene Florence Street. For community service.
- Audrey Marion Wines. For service to the St. John's Ambulance Brigade.

State of Queensland

- Oliver Noel Fatnowna. For services to the Aboriginal people.
- Mary Patricia Fogarty. For services to the community.
- Cedric Alan Roy Luck. For services to the community.
- Richard Mahoney. For services to youth and sport.
- Mary Margaret Markwell. For public service.
- Sister Lpurdes Moylan. For services to the Church and community.
- Gwendolyn Nielsen. For services to music and the community.
- Councillor Christian John Thomas Ohl. For services to local government and to the community.
- Lloyd Thomas Sommerfeld. For services to youth.
- Rennie Samuel Vorpagel. For services to primary industries.

State of South Australia

- Eric Johnston Ashby. For services to sheep breeding and the community
- Jean Helen Baily. For services to horse riding.
- Glen Gordon Cant. For services to the community.
- Bernard Gordon Chamberlain. For services to the community.
- Margaret Nora Ewens. For services to the Red Cross.
- Jaroslav Pecanek. For services to the community.
- Robert George Powell. For services to the community.
- Carl Martin Roennfeldt. For services to the community.

State of Western Australia

- Nell Blacker. For service to the community.
- Alice Fuller. For service to the community.
- Lilian May Green. For service to the community.
- Cecil Edwin Thomas Lucas. For service to St. John Ambulance.
- Agnes Francis McKay. For service to the community.
- Bernice Marian McLeod. For service to the community.

=== Royal Red Cross (RRC) ===
- Colonel Dorothy Norah Morton (432663), Queen Alexandra's Royal Army Nursing Corps.
- Lieutenant Colonel Mary Christine Pettegree, ARRC, (444900), Queen Alexandra's Royal Army Nursing Corps.
- Lieutenant Colonel Mary Matilda Trist, TD, (470587), Queen Alexandra's Royal Army Nursing Corps, Territorial Army (now R.A.R.O).
- Wing Commander Joan Doreen Smedley, ARRC, (407385), Princess Mary's Royal Air Force Nursing Service.

==== Associate of the Royal Red Cross (ARRC) ====
- Superintendent Sister Jean Valentine Morton, Queen Alexandra's Royal Naval Nursing Service.
- Matron Monica Mary Springall, Queen Alexandra's Royal Naval Nursing Service.
- Major Kathleen Ann Kiggins (434294), Queen Alexandra's Royal Army Nursing Corps.
- Major Sheila Leslie McAulay (494562), Queen Alexandra's Royal Army Nursing Corps.
- Major Jennifer Anne Thewlis (476146), Queen Alexandra's Royal Army Nursing Corps (now R.A.R.O.).
- Squadron Leader Josephine Nanna Mary Boase (408337), Princess Mary's Royal Air Force Nursing Service.
- Squadron Leader Elizabeth Muriel Harris (407823), Princess Mary's Royal Air Force Nursing Service.
- Squadron Leader Jean Simpson (408482), Princess Mary's Royal Air Force Nursing Service.

=== Air Force Cross (AFC) ===
- Wing Commander Richard Cyril McKestlay, MBE, (608273), (Retired).
- Squadron Leader Michael John Gray (4231826).
- Squadron Leader Brian Richard Hoskins (4232225).
- Squadron Leader Brian Sydney Morris (4232141).
- Squadron Leader Steven Mark Nicholl (508085).
- Flight Lieutenant Nicholas Jackson Grose (8025735).

Bar to the Air Force Cross

- Squadron Leader Colin John Cruickshanks, AFC, (608498).

=== Queen's Police Medal (QPM) ===
England And Wales

- John Frederick Challis, Chief Superintendent, Essex Police.
- Thomas Farr, Chief Superintendent, Cheshire Constabulary.
- Kenneth Forster, Chief Superintendent, Greater Manchester Police.
- William Albert Gatward, Chief Superintendent, Leicestershire Constabulary.
- George Kenneth Gibson, Assistant Chief Constable, Staffordshire Police.
- Jeffrey Richard Greenwood, Chief Superintendent, North Yorkshire Police.
- Ronald Harvey, Commander, Metropolitan Police.
- Horace Reginald Hill, Former Assistant Chief Constable, Cleveland Constabulary.
- Donald Bryan Humphries, Chief Superintendent, Warwickshire Constabulary.
- Robert Brian Johnson, Deputy Chief Constable, Lancashire Constabulary.
- Edgar Frank Maybanks, Deputy Assistant Commissioner, Metropolitan Police.
- Aidan Anthony Mullett, Assistant Chief Constable, West Mercia Constabulary.
- William Thomas Charles Pullinger, Assistant Chief Constable, Hertfordshire Constabulary (Assistant Commandant, Police Staff College, Bramshill).
- Jim Moore Sewell, Commander, Metropolitan Police.
- Edward John Stow, Commander, Metropolitan Police.

Northern Ireland

- Joseph Donald McKenzie, Chief Inspector, Royal Ulster Constabulary.

Scotland

- Paul Newell, Deputy Chief Constable, Dumfries and Galloway Constabulary.

Australian States

State of Queensland

- Joseph Keith Mcdonnell, Superintendent, Queensland Police Force.

State of South Australia

- Kevin Percival Esdale Harvey, Superintendent, South Australian Police Force.

State of Western Australia

- Roy Robert James Guest, Assistant Commissioner, Western Australian Police Force.
- Peter William McGrath, Chief Superintendent, Western Australian Police Force.

=== Queen's Fire Services Medal (QFSM) ===
England And Wales

- Dennis Baker, Assistant Chief Officer, West Yorkshire Fire Brigade.
- Edward Arthur Harrington, Assistant Chief Officer, London Fire Brigade.
- Andrew Bruce Campbell Hogg, Chief Officer, Norfolk Fire Brigade.
- David Sibson, Leading Fireman, Derbyshire Fire Service.
- Henry Arthur Jones, Chief Officer, South Yorkshire County Fire Service.

Jersey

- William Mahoney, Chief Officer, States of Jersey Fire Service.

Australian States

State of Victoria

- Harold William Baptist, Captain, Noble Park Urban Fire Brigade.
- Ernest Charles Caddy, Captain, Drouin Urban Fire Brigade.
- Roderick George Coutts, Group Officer, Kaniva and District Fire Brigade.
- Geoffrey Thomas Evans, Brigade Captain, Echuca Fire Brigade.
- Douglas Henry Lade, Communications Officer, Highlands-Caveat Rural Fire Brigade.

State of South Australia

- Frederick Llewellyn Angus, South Australian Fire Brigade.

=== Colonial Police Medal (CPM) ===
- Lam Au, Sergeant of Police, Royal Hong Kong Police Force.
- John Franklin Barnes, Chief Inspector of Police, Royal Hong Kong Police Force.
- Kwan-to Chan, Inspector of Police, Royal Hong Kong Police Force.
- Kai-wing Chan, Superintendent of Police, Royal Hong Kong Police Force.
- Robert Cheng, Chief Inspector of Police, Royal Hong Kong Police Force.
- Tsang Chik, Station Sergeant of Police, Royal Hong Kong Police Force.
- John Brian Gouldsmith, Senior Superintendent of Police, Royal Hong Kong Police Force.
- Yi-fu Keung, Station Sergeant of Police, Royal Hong Kong Police Force.
- Ip Kwan, Principal Ambulanceman, Hong Kong Fire Services.
- Sheung-hung Lai, Station Sergeant of Police, Royal Hong Kong Police Force.
- To-yee Lau, Senior Superintendent of Police, Royal Hong Kong Police Force.
- Kin-biu Lee, Divisional Officer, Hong Kong Fire Services.
- Lawrence Chung-fu Lee, Superintendent (Auxiliary), Royal Hong Kong Police Force.
- Sung Li, Inspector of Police, Royal Hong Kong Police Force.
- Sze Ma, Principal Fireman, Hong Kong Fire Services.
- Kevin McCann, Superintendent of Police, Cayman Islands Police Force.
- Major-General Corran William Brooke Purdon, CBE, MC, lately Deputy Commissioner of Police, Royal Hong Kong Police Force.
- Geoffrey William Roper, Senior Superintendent of Police, Royal Hong Kong Police Force.
- Che-hung Sit, Ambulance Officer, Hong Kong Fire Services.
- Keith Tidey, Superintendent of Police, Royal Hong Kong Police Force.

=== Queen's Commendation for Valuable Service in the Air ===
Royal Navy

- Lieutenant Commander Geoffrey Darrell Varley.

Royal Air Force

- Squadron Leader Terence Raymond Adcock (686516), (Retired).
- Squadron Leader James Campbell (3020521).
- Squadron Leader Malcolm George Cooper (685812).
- Squadron Leader Michael Robert William Crook (608614).
- Squadron Leader Alan Robert Goss, MBE, (2236576).
- Squadron Leader Michael Alan Paley (4230703).
- Squadron Leader Ian Reilly (608491).
- Squadron Leader Roland William Shimmons (608538).
- Squadron Leader Horatio William Farquhar-Smith (2617602).
- Squadron Leader Alan Peter Waldron (4232860), for services with the Royal Brunei Malay Regiment.
- Flight Lieutenant Michael Adrian Barratt (4041276).
- Flight Lieutenant Anthony George Oakley Dee (8020789).
- Flight Lieutenant Mitchell Noel Lees (8025497).
- Flight Lieutenant Robert John Mason (8025494).
- Flight Lieutenant Andrew James Sephton (5201012).
- Flight Lieutenant Nicholas John Slater (8020960).
- Master Air Electronics Operator Cyril Ball (S4030032).
- Master Air Loadmaster Graham Bearham (N1933778).
- Master Air Loadmaster Robert Terence Brown (X2689138).

United Kingdom

- Frederick George Ritchie, lately Senior Helicopter Pilot, Warton Division, Aircraft Group British Aerospace plc.

== Australia ==
=== Order of the Companions of Honour (CH) ===
- The Right Honourable John Douglas Anthony, M.P., Deputy Prime Minister.

=== Knight Bachelor ===
- Maurice Hearne Byers, CBE, QC. For public service.
- James Henry Brownlow Carr. For service to horse racing.
- Raymond Alfred Ferrall, CBE. For service to industry, commerce and the community.
- The Honourable Mr. Justice William Edward Stanley Forster. For service to law.
- The Honourable Mr. Justice James Augustine Gobbo. For service to migrants.
- The Honourable Louis Adrian Solomons, MLC. For public and community service.
- John Gardiner Wilson, CBE. For service to commerce.

=== Order of the Bath ===
==== Companion of the Order of the Bath (CB) ====
Civil Division

- Dr. John Law Farrands. For public service.
- Albert Frank Spratt. For public service.

=== Order of Saint Michael and Saint George ===
==== Knight Commander of the Order of St Michael and St George (KCMG) ====
- Senator The Honourable John Leslie Carrick. For parliamentary service.

==== Companion of the Order of St Michael and St George (CMG) ====
- Professor Gordon Greenwood. For service to education in international affairs.
- Sali Herman, OBE. For service to art.
- The Honourable Keith Colin McKenzie. For public service.

=== Order of the British Empire ===
==== Dame Commander of the Order of the British Empire (DBE) ====
Civil Division

- Doris Alice Fitton (Mrs. Mason), CBE. For service to the theatre.

==== Knight Commander of the Order of the British Empire (KBE) ====
Civil Division

- The Honourable Ransley Victor Garland. For parliamentary service.

==== Commander of the Order of the British Empire (CBE) ====
Military Division

- Commodore Ian Hawkins Nicholson, 0866, Royal Australian Navy.
- Brigadier Ivan Rupert Wilson Brumfield, DSO, 2507, Australian Staff Corps.

Civil Division

- Olive Eva Anstey, MBE. For service to nursing.
- John William Bourchier, MP. For parliamentary service.
- Bruce Langton Burton. For service to the automotive industry.
- Dr. Bruce Francis Ford, MBE. For service to disabled people.
- Bryan Nivison Kelman. For service to industry.
- Associate Professor Lawrence McCredie. For service to disabled people.
- Professor Kevin William Ryan. For service to the ethnic community and education.
- Dr. Sidney Sax. For public service.
- Harold Charles Schmidt. For service to commerce and primary industry.
- John Harrison Valder. For service to commerce.

==== Officer of the Order of the British Empire (OBE) ====
Civil Division

- Prudence Leigh Acton (Mrs. Treloar). For service to fashion.
- John Bennison, For service to primary industry.
- The Reverend Roger Bush, MBE. For service to the community.
- Joan Maralyn Carden (Mrs. Coyne). For service to opera.
- Geoffrey Jack Churcher. For public service.
- Brian Field Cox, MVO. For public service.
- Dr. Dilys Mary Craven. For service to women in the fields of medicine and paediatrics.
- Ruth Lissant Dobson. For public service.
- Maxwell Spencer Dupain. For service to photography.
- Commander Frank Geoffrey Evans, MBE, VRD. For service to the Navy League of Australia.
- Valerie Claire Fisher. For service to women's affairs.
- Leslie Bernard Foley. For public service.
- Dr. John Aylward Game. For service to medicine in neurology.
- Jean Hazel Garside, MBE. For service to disabled people.
- Dr. Kevin Leahy King. For service to medicine.
- Chief Commissioner Stacey Lester Kruck. For service to Defence Force welfare and the community.
- William Joseph Liu. For service to the Chinese community.
- Dr. Marcus Liveris. For service to Greek migrants and the community.
- Alderman Mervyn Henry Charles Locke. For service to local government and the community.
- Anne Matheson. For service to journalism.
- Ronald James Michell. For service to the wool industry.
- Joseph Monro. For public service.
- Dr. John Raymond Moon. For service to medicine in alcoholism.
- Alderman Leslie Noel Short, JP. For service to local government and the community.
- Clive Thompson. For service to banking.
- Ronald Sherman Thompson. For public service.
- Dr. Ronald Harry Wharton. For public service in biological research.
- The Right Reverend Ralph Edwin Wicks. For service to religion, to Defence Force welfare and the community.

==== Member of the Order of the British Empire (MBE) ====
Military Division

Royal Australian Navy

- Lieutenant Barry John Fregon, 059569.
- Lieutenant Commander Henry Albert Longdon Hall, E1519, RAN Emergency List.
- Lieutenant Commander George Hugh Fitzalien Poole-Warren, E2796, RAN Emergency List.

Australian Army

- Major Philip Cherril Cooper, 17128, Royal Australian Engineers.
- Major John James Michael Doyle, 311560, Royal Australian Infantry.
- Captain Lawrence Edmund Fraser, 53151, Royal Australian Infantry.
- Captain Noel Terrance Hall, 34887, Royal Australian Army Ordnance Corps.
- Major Bruce Clifford Hill, ED, 3129608, Royal Australian Infantry.
- Captain Gregory Mawkes, 38571, Royal Australian Infantry.

Royal Australian Air Force

- Flight Lieutenant Stephen John Gray, 047378.
- Squadron Leader Geoffrey Pickburn, 0310937.
- Flight Lieutenant Brian Richard Watkins, 0221510.

Civil Division

- Councillor Murdoch McLennan Aylmer, JP. For service to local government and the community.
- Burlton Albert Brown. For service to racing.
- The Reverend Father Petras Butkus. For service to religion, the Lithuanian community and youth.
- Daphne Munro Carpenter. For public service.
- Kevin Carpenter. For public service.
- Neville Lawrence Cavendish. For service to the community.
- Nance Clark. For service to nursing.
- Albert Francis Coaxes. For service to disabled people and veterans.
- Keith Charles Kingsley Conkers. For service to primary industry and community.
- Daniel Thomas Conway, DFC. For public service.
- Walter Andrew Thomas Grain. For service to surf lifesaving and the community.
- Reginald Hamilton Culley. For service to veterans.
- Thomas Godfrey Culley. For service to primary industry.
- Raymond George Everingham. For service to the banana industry.
- Elsie Annie Findlay (Mrs. Lawson). For services to singing.
- Angelo Gabrielli. For service to the ethnic community.
- Owen Evans Griffiths. For community service.
- Ilse Halpern. For service to the community and migrant welfare.
- John Stephen Harper. For service to university administration.
- Lucy Marjory Hertz. For service to the arts and the community.
- Ronald Alexander Horne, JP. For service to the community and disabled people.
- William Lewis Hurd. For service to disabled people.
- Kenneth Stuart Hutchings. For public service.
- Elizabeth Isaacs. For service to Aboriginal welfare.
- John Antoine Kiosoglous. For service to migrants and the community.
- Eric Hooper Lacey. For service to local government and primary industry.
- Colonel Eric Burnley Le Fevre, ED. For public service and service to veterans.
- Keith Alexander Lowe. For service to veterans and the community.
- Norman McArthur. For service to the shoe industry and the community.
- Peter McLaren. For public service.
- Graham Vivian Marsh. For service to golf.
- Rodney William Marsh. For service to cricket.
- Joan May Massie. For service to nursing and the community.
- Robert Harry Mathams, MC. For public service.
- Francis William Somerville Milne. For public service.
- Frances Campbell Nicholls. For community service.
- Robert Owen Nunn. For service to Australian rules football.
- Alan Lloyd Odgers. For public service.
- George Nicholas Pappas. For service to the ethnic community.
- The Reverend James Richmond Payne. For service to religion.
- Gordon Clarence Pike, BEM. For public service.
- William Harold Ponsford. For service to cricket.
- The Most Reverend Bishop Ivan Prasko. For service to religion and the Ukrainian community.
- Colin Samuel Pyrke. For service to the community.
- Lewis Thomas Charles Richards. For service to Australian rules football.
- Barrie Charles Robran. For service to Australian rules football.
- The Reverend Monsignor Bernard Canice Rogers. For service to religion and community.
- Sister Agatha (Miss Shirley Patricia Rogers). For service to disadvantaged children.
- Dr. Hendrik Johan Rutgers. For service to Dutch community.
- Hugh Joseph Shuttleworth. For service to veterans.
- Malcolm Edward Kensett Smith. For service to the community.
- Margaret Dorothy Stiller. For service to education and the community.
- Edith Taylor. For service to the community.
- Aileen Elizabeth Westcott. For service to disabled people.
- Ethel Dallas Wharton. For service to Aboriginal welfare, the community and nursing.
- Riley Yuen Wing. For service to the ethnic community and sport.

=== Companion of the Imperial Service Order (ISO) ===
- Edward George Crossing. For public service.
- Patrick McNamara. For public service.
- Leslie Portley. For public service.
- Gordon Ernest Sheen. For public service.

=== British Empire Medal (BEM) ===
Military Division
Royal Australian Navy

- Chief Petty Officer Anthony Lawrence John Brine, R59663.
- Chief Petty Officer William Henry Stokes, R59949.

Australian Army

- Sergeant Kenneth Noel Edwards, 3794832, Royal Australian Electrical and Mechanical Engineers.
- Corporal Thomas William Lomax, 256141, Royal Australian Army Medical Corps.
- Lance Corporal Richard Lynch, 2787050, Royal Australian Infantry.
- Staff Sergeant Peter Julius Shane, 37342, Royal Australian Army Medical Corps.
- Corporal Kevin Harry Taylor, 2411998, Royal Australian Corps of Transport.
- Sergeant David Leonard Willis, 216956, Royal Australian Infantry.

Royal Australian Air Force

- Flight Sergeant Ian Keith Armstrong, A44234.
- Sergeant Errol Peter Ryan, A118714.
- Flight Sergeant Rodney Charles Smith, A222876.
- Flight Sergeant Graham Lindsay Frank Sutcliffe, A222357.

Civil Division

- Celia Maisie Ballhausen. For community service.
- Alma Dorothy Brierley. For community service.
- Arthur Rodney Burndred. For public service.
- Edna Valerie Crohn. For service to the Girl Guide movement and the community.
- Dorothy May Fowler. For community service.
- Percy Gibson. For community service.
- George Wilfred Graham. For service to veterans.
- Bernard William Greer. For service to the community.
- Charles Harrison Gumley. For community service.
- Phillis Hilda Norma Hadley. For service to animal welfare.
- Rex John Harris. For service to youth, the aged and the community.
- Joyce Thora Hagon Hayward. For service to the performing arts and the community.
- Gerald Arthur Jones. For public service.
- Vincent James Kelly. For service to tennis.
- Fred Hermitage Lacey. For service to the community and veterans.
- Enid Josephine Leahy. For public service.
- Vida Adeline Legro. For community service.
- Harry Plastow Mattocks. For community service.
- Courtney John Morris. For public service.
- Joseph Anthony Murphy. For public service.
- Robert Leslie Powell, JP. For community service.
- Harold Raymond Prior. For service to the community and veterans.
- Ernest Allen Riethmuller. For service to the community and veterans.
- Percy Stephen Roberts. For public service.
- Roland Arthur Stanley Scott Roe. For service to veterans and the community.
- Frederick Andrew Runciman, JP. For service to the dairy industry.
- Joan Edith Lorraine Rutherford. For community service.
- Frederick William Norman Ryan. For public service.
- Joan Sawtell. For service to war widows, youth and the community.
- George Fowler Taylor. For public service.
- Augustus Albert Theobald. Service to athletics.
- Peter Michael Tully. For public service.
- Bryan Wallace. For service to youth and the community.
- James Wilson Webster. For community service.
- Una Mary Wilkin-Smith. For community service.
- Michael Richard Wooley, JP. For service to disabled people.

=== Royal Red Cross (RRC) ===
==== Associate of the Royal Red Cross (ARRC) ====
Royal Australian Navy

- Commander Jane Greenslade, N2375, Royal Australian Naval Nursing Service.

Australian Army

- Lieutenant Pamela Joy Wright, F12627, Royal Australian Army Nursing Corps.

Royal Australian Air Force

- Wing Commander Pegeen Mallon, N110888, Royal Australian Air Force Nursing Service.
- Squadron Leader Carole Ann O'Connor, N225025, Royal Australian Air Force Nursing Service.

=== Air Force Cross (AFC) ===
Royal Australian Navy

- Sub Lieutenant Maxwell Allen Herriman, 0117993.

Royal Australian Air Force

- Squadron Leader Christopher Allan Beatty, DFC, 045549.
- Squadron Leader Ian Douglas Fogarty, 0317512.

=== Queen's Commendation for Valuable Service in the Air ===
Royal Australian Navy

- Lieutenant Commander Victor Thomas Battese, 02462.

Royal Australian Air Force

- Corporal Edward Kym Manuel, A47799.
- Squadron Leader Ronald David Mitchell, 0317787.
- Corporal Shaun David O'Sullivan, A122281.
- Sergeant Allan Ernest Shaw, A57006.

=== Queen's Police Medal (QPM) ===
- Leonard Roy Cossons, Assistant Commissioner, Northern Territory Police Force.

== Mauritius ==
=== Knight Bachelor ===
- Louis Pierre René Maingard de la Ville-ès-Offrans, CBE. For services to shipping and industrial development.

=== Order of Saint Michael and Saint George ===
==== Companion of the Order of St Michael and St George (CMG) ====
- Dayanundlall Basant Rai, OBE. For political and public services.

=== Order of the British Empire ===
==== Commander of the Order of the British Empire (CBE) ====
Civil Division

- Jean Marc David, QC. For public service.

==== Officer of the Order of the British Empire (OBE) ====
Civil Division

- Dr. Joseph Patrick Ah Fee Chui Wan Cheong. For services to social medicine.
- Aneerood Naga. For services to commerce and industry.
- Dr. Tekman Rajkoomar. For public service in radiology.
- Bissoonsing Seewoopaul. For voluntary social work.
- Luckainaram Sohun. For voluntary social work.
- Noel Philippe Guy Tursan D'Espaignet, lately Clerk of the Legislative Assembly.
- Masilamani Veerasamy. For voluntary social work.

==== Member of the Order of the British Empire (MBE) ====
Civil Division

- Ramourthar Bholah. For voluntary social work.
- Yves Reynolds Blackburn. For public service.
- Marie-Therese Esther. For public service.
- Sarapjit Huldarowa. For voluntary social work.
- Davaperooual Mootoosamy. For services to commerce.
- Jabul Ramchurn. For voluntary social work.
- Chutturgoon Seechurn. For voluntary social work.

=== Mauritius Police Medal ===
- Brigmohun Booputh, Constable, Mauritius Police Force.
- Anirood Luchmun, Chief Inspector, Mauritius Police Force.
- Paramassivam Moutou, Inspector, Mauritius Police Force.
- Lewis Luc Raqusing, Chief Inspector, Mauritius Police Force.

== Fiji ==
=== Order of the British Empire ===
==== Commander of the Order of the British Empire (CBE) ====
Civil Division

- Josefa Emosi Rigamoto, MBE, MM, Assistant Commissioner, Native Lands Commission.

==== Officer of the Order of the British Empire (OBE) ====
Civil Division

- Alfred George Edwards. For service to the community.
- Dr. Wilisoni Tuiketei Malani. For service to medicine and the community.
- Beniram Ragawanand Rambisheswar. For service to the community.

==== Member of the Order of the British Empire (MBE) ====
Military Division

- Chaplain Class III Iliesa Tuivouwa Buadromo, lately Chaplain, 1st Battalion, Fiji Infantry Regiment.
- Major Maciu Muani Cerewale, Territorial Force, Royal Fiji Military Forces.
- Warrant Officer Class I Laisenia Nakauvadra, Royal Fiji Military Forces.

Civil Division

- Kathleen Marian Keith-Reid, Private Secretary to the Governor-General.
- Shiu Narayan. For service to the community.
- Paula Naveata, Conveyancing Clerk, Native Land Trust Board.
- Ratu Alivereti Ramatai. For service to the community.
- Josefa Vutoro Raqona. For service to rural development.

=== Companion of the Imperial Service Order (ISO) ===
- James Bechan Satyanand. For public service in education.

=== British Empire Medal (BEM) ===
Military Division

- Warrant Officer Class 2 Ilisoni Tulevu Covunisaqa, Territorial Force, Royal Fiji Military Forces.

Civil Division

- Francis Ah Tong, Senior Technical Officer, Public Works Department.

== Papua New Guinea ==
=== Order of the British Empire ===
==== Knight Commander of the Order of the British Empire (KBE) ====
Civil Division

- The Most Reverend Virgil Patrick Copas. For services to religion.

==== Commander of the Order of the British Empire (CBE) ====
Civil Division

- Ignatius Kilage, Chief Ombudsman.
- The Honourable Jacob Talia Lemeki, MP. For services to labour.

==== Officer of the Order of the British Empire (OBE) ====
Civil Division

- Ono Ala. For services to local and provincial government.
- Renagi Renagi Lohia, Vice Chancellor, University of Papua New Guinea.
- William Sydney Peckover. For services to telecommunications and ornithology.
- Bernard Paul Songo, Secretary for Education.
- Ronald Tovue. For public service.

==== Member of the Order of the British Empire (MBE) ====
Civil Division

- Patrick Joseph Batho. Principal Research Officer, Department of Urban Development.
- Senior Inspector John Charles Bayagau. For services as ADC to the Governor-General.
- Ian Irving Gass, Registrar, Papua New Guinea University of Technology.
- Cyril Ernest Holland. For services to the community.
- Willie Jerewal. For services to education.
- Apelis Kasino. For public and community services.
- Madaha Resena. For services to local government and the community.
- John Adrian Shields, General Secretary of the Police Association.
- Albert Taveokoro. For services to the community.
- Nerrie Kokot Tololo. For services to women.
- Egi Trudi, Manager, Administration Department, Papua New Guinea Development Bank.
- Yauwe Wauwe, Speaker, Simbu Provincial Government.

=== Companion of the Imperial Service Order (ISO) ===
- Arua Udu Nou. For public service.

=== British Empire Medal (BEM) ===
Military Division

- 83137 Sergeant (Provisional Warrant Officer) Shey Pincher Gubag, Papua New Guinea Defence Force.
- 82428 Sergeant (Provisional Warrant Officer) Iruru Leafeare, Papua New Guinea Defence Force.
- 81984 Sergeant Sere Orake, Papua New Guinea Defence Force.

Civil Division

- Jack Arifeae. For public service in broadcasting.
- 0322 Senior Sergeant Lauseva Biamani, Royal Papua New Guinea Constabulary.
- Siau Bukerau. For public service.
- Koyebu Giles. For public service as a hospital orderly.
- Lohia Mou. For public service as a driver.
- 1078 Sergeant Nihute Pepe, Royal Papua New Guinea Constabulary.
- 2689 Sergeant Major Labert Pidian, Royal Papua New Guinea Constabulary.
- Kunini Tege. For community services.
- 0186 Sergeant Major Tarn Tigador, Royal Papua New Guinea Constabulary.
- Allan Vago. For public service as an aid post orderly.

=== Air Force Cross (AFC) ===
- 058381 Flight Lieutenant John Michael Fander-Linden, Royal Australian Air Force.

== Solomon Islands ==
=== Order of the British Empire ===
==== Knight Commander of the Order of the British Empire (KBE) ====
Civil Division

- The Right Honourable Peter Kauona Keninaraiso'ona Kenilorea. For political services.

==== Officer of the Order of the British Empire (OBE) ====
Civil Division

- Eric Sydney Mason, MBE, Under-Secretary (Agriculture).

==== Member of the Order of the British Empire (MBE) ====
Civil Division

- Moffat Bonunga. For national and provincial political services.
- Augustine Manakako, Permanent Secretary, Ministry of Education and Training.
- Ivor Qalolilio. For service as seamanship instructor.
- Sister (Miss) Mary Christopher Slattery. For services to education.

=== British Empire Medal (BEM) ===
Civil Division

- Mark Aubo. For services as a hospital cook.
- Jesimiel Maeniuta. For services to the Church and the community.

== Tuvalu ==
=== Order of the British Empire ===
==== Member of the Order of the British Empire (MBE) ====
Civil Division

- Simati Faaniu. For public service.

=== British Empire Medal (BEM) ===
Civil Division

- Toematangi Samuelu. For service to the community.

== Saint Lucia ==
=== Order of the British Empire ===
==== Officer of the Order of the British Empire (OBE) ====
Civil Division

- Eusebe Alexander Lawrence, QPM, CPM, Commissioner of Police.

==== Member of the Order of the British Empire (MBE) ====
Civil Division

- Therese Myra Darcheville-Eastmond. For services to education and the community.
- Andreuille Nympha Naomi Parker, Matron, Victoria Hospital.

== Saint Vincent and the Grenadines ==
=== Order of the British Empire ===
==== Commander of the Order of the British Empire (CBE) ====
Civil Division

- Archdeacon Charles Alexander Adams, MBE. For service to the community.

==== Officer of the Order of the British Empire (OBE) ====
Civil Division

- Dr. Ian Ayrton Earle Kirby, JP. For public and community service.
