= Wilisoni Tuiketei Malani =

Ratu Wilisoni Tuiketei Malani OBE OStJ JP (1920 – 14 June 2005) was the younger brother of Ratu Meli Salabogi, a Fijian chief, medical doctor, and politician. He was the Headboy of Queen Victoria School (Fiji) in 1940.

== Recognition ==
He was awarded the Order of the British Empire in 1981.

He was chairman of the Ra Provincial Council.
