= Bill McCue =

Scottish singer

William Lang Denholm McCue OBE (1934–1999) was a Scottish singer known for his performances in opera, musical theatre and traditional Scottish folk music. Bill was born in Allanton on 17 August 1934. In 1974 he appeared in the BBC TV's long running music hall variety show, The Good old Days. In 1982 he was awarded an OBE for his contribution to Scottish music.

In 1986 McCue played the role of Diligence in the Scottish Theatre Company's production of Sir David Lyndsay's An Satyre of the Thrie Estaitis, directed by Tom Fleming.

In 1999 he died aged 65.
