= Audrey Purton =

Lieutenant Colonel Audrey Irene Purton OBE (8 May 1926 – 20 May 2016) was Deputy Assistant Provost Marshal of the Women’s Royal Army Corps (WRAC) from 1975 to 1982.

Her 1982 OBE citation stated "that through her dedication, persistence and selfless concern for the Army and her policewomen she had created an elite branch of the Provost Service."

She never married.
