= Norman Hillier-Fry =

British diplomat (1923–2015)

William Norman Hillier-Fry, CMG (12 August 1923 – 11 January 2015) was a British diplomat. He died in January 2015 at the age of 91.

Educated at Colfe's Grammar School and St Edmund Hall, Oxford, Hillier-Fry was commissioned into the Loyal Regiment in 1942. After the War, he joined HM Foreign Service in 1946. He served as British Ambassador to Afghanistan between 1979 and 1980. Subsequently, he was the British High Commissioner to Uganda between 1980 and 1983. He was appointed CMG in 1982
