= Dilys Craven =

Australian paediatrician (1919–2008)

Dilys Craven OBE (1919–2008) was an Australian paediatrician.

Craven was born in Wales in 1919, and graduated from the Welsh National School of Medicine in 1942. She served in the Royal Army Medical Corps during World War II. She married David Craven in 1950 and the two emigrated to Australia. She was a specialist in paediatrics at the Adelaide Children's Hospital, beginning in 1951, then held the same position at the Queen Elizabeth Hospital, also in Adelaide, South Australia.

Craven completed her MD at the University of Adelaide in 1966. She served two terms as president of the South Australian Medical Women's Society and was president of the Australian Federation of Medical Women in 1980, and was appointed an Officer of the Order of the British Empire in 1982 "for her services to medicine and paediatrics". Craven retired from medical practice in 1984, but retained her links with area hospitals as Emeritus Physician.
