= Britain in Bloom =

Horticultural campaign in the UK

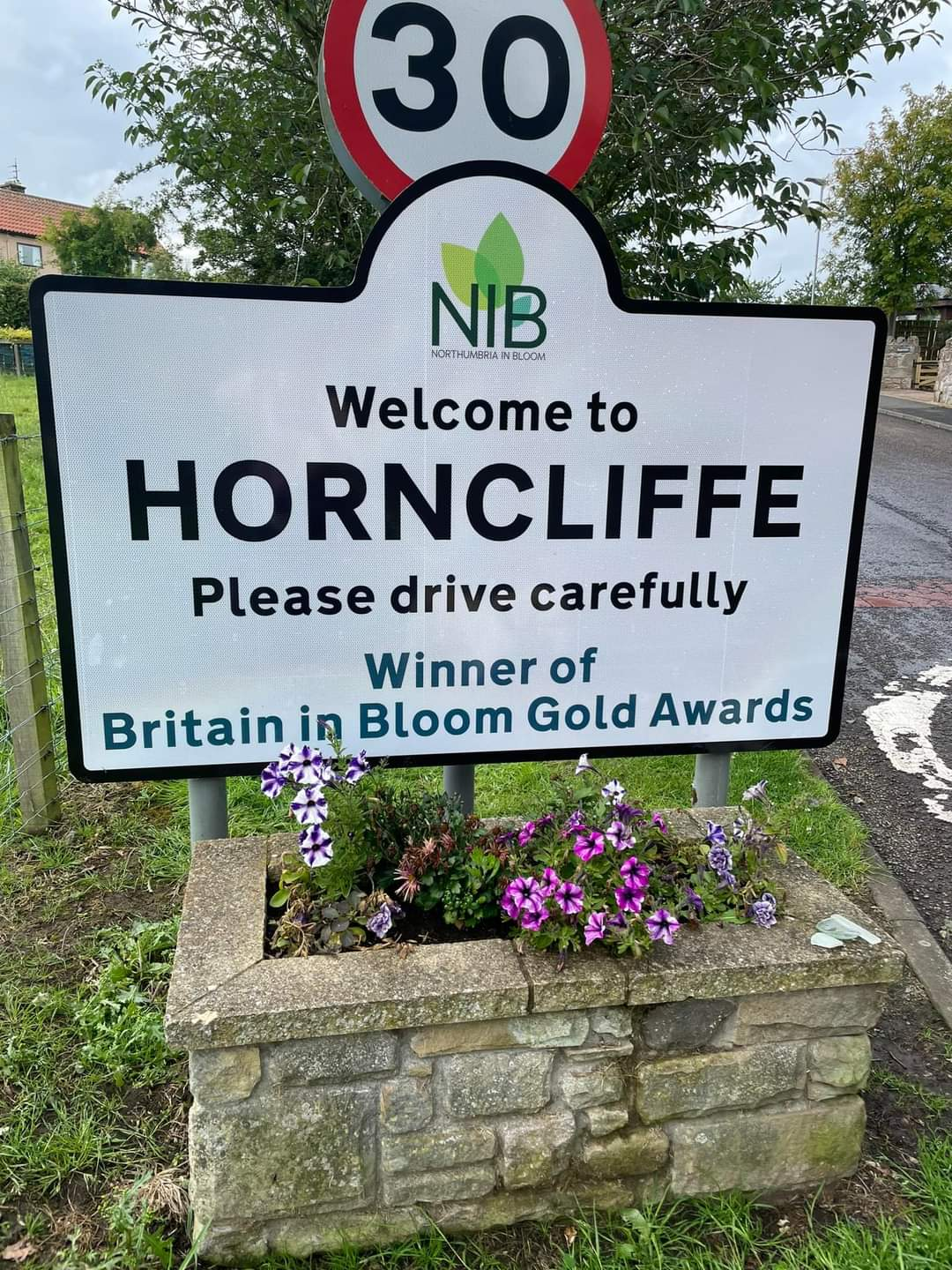
Horncliffe: Winner of Britain in Bloom Gold Awards, 2023

RHS Britain in Bloom is the largest horticultural campaign in the United Kingdom. It was first held in 1964, initiated by the British Tourist Board based on the example set by Fleurissement de France (now Conseil national de villes et villages fleuris), which since 1959 has promoted the annual Concours des villes et villages fleuris. It has been organised by the Royal Horticultural Society (RHS) since 2002.

The competition is entered by the communities of towns, villages and cities. Different categories exist for various sizes of settlements. Groups are assessed for their achievements in three core pillars: Horticultural Excellence; Environmental Responsibility; and Community Participation.

Over 1,600 communities around the UK enter each year, participating in their local region's "in Bloom" campaign. From these regional competitions, roughly 80 communities are selected to enter the national Finals of RHS Britain in Bloom.

It is a popular campaign, estimated to involve more than 200,000 volunteers in cleaning up and greening up their local area.

Since 2002, the awards have been based on the Royal Horticultural Society's medal standards of Gold, Silver Gilt, Silver and Bronze; the winner is the settlement judged to have most successfully met the rigorous judging criteria. Judging at the regional stage takes place around June/ July; judging for the national stage takes place in August. The results for the UK Finals are announced in September/ October. The competition covers the UK, the Channel Islands and the Isle of Man.

Floral displays play an important part in the contest, but the "Bloom" title is now, perhaps, misleading: in recent years the competition has increasingly assessed how all sectors of the local community are managing their local environment.

In 2006, the RHS introduced the Neighbourhood Awards (now the It's Your Neighbourhood campaign), a grassroots sister campaign to Bloom, supporting smaller, volunteer-led community groups focused on improving their immediate environment.

== History ==
The history of the 'Bloom', as it is colloquially referred to, began in 1964 when Roy Hay MBE, a horticultural journalist, went on holiday to France during the Fleurissement de France and was enthralled by seeing the country "filled to overflowing with flowers, shrubs and trees all in full bloom". His enquiries revealed that President de Gaulle had given orders to brighten up the country and the French Tourist Authority had set up the Fleurissement de France in 1959 (now called Concours des villes et villages fleuris). Hay was so impressed that he approached the British Tourist Authority (BTA), and he and Len Lickorish, then Director General of the BTA, set up a committee to run a British version, "Britain in Bloom". It was piloted by the British Tourist Authority in 1963 (Lewisham being part of that pilot), and went national in 1964.

Many organisations were invited to help, including: The Automobile Association; London Tourist Board; National Farmers' Union; London Parks; Institute of Parks and Recreation Administration; National Association of Rural Communities; Royal Horticultural Society; Royal Automobile Club; The Tourist Boards of England, Scotland and Wales; The National Federation of Women's Institutes; Civic Trust; Keep Britain Tidy Group; the Flowers and Plants Council; The Horticultural Trades Association; The British Hotels and Restaurants Association; The Society of Town Clerks; Townswomen's Guild and British Airways. Despite this impressive list, Roy Hay later reflected that the initial reaction of the horticultural trade and local authorities was lukewarm.

Nevertheless, regional committees were quickly formed, and in 1964 Bath became the first national winner. From 1964 to 1969 inclusive there was an overall national winner. From 1970, however, the competition was divided up into a range of categories, because of the difficulty of comparing settlements of different sizes fairly.

The British Tourist Authority managed the competition until 1983 when the Government Department sponsoring the BTA felt that it should relinquish the responsibility. The Tidy Britain Group (the group responsible for the Keep Britain Tidy campaign, now known as EnCams) took over; it already had a long association with the competition. To mark the changeover, 1983 was celebrated as "Beautiful Britain in Bloom Year". Sir Lawrie Barratt of Barratt Developments expressed his support to the Tidy Britain Group for the competition and provided sponsorship until 1989.

More categories and awards were added, in part reflecting a greater range of settlements, but also to recognise other elements of horticulture, including landscaping, and also to recognise the strenuous efforts to beautify the urban areas of the larger cities. McDonald's began sponsoring the competition from 1990, which led to focus on littering behaviour and the implementation of a Children's Painting Competition Calendar. In 2001, the event was organised jointly by EnCams and the Royal Horticultural Society, and from November 2001 the RHS took full control as the organising body of Britain in Bloom.

Year	Organising Body	Main Sponsor
1964 to 1982	British Tourist Authority	No main sponsor
1983 to 1989	Tidy Britain Group	Barratt Developments
1990 to TBC	Tidy Britain Group	McDonald's
2001	Tidy Britain Group & Royal Horticultural Society	TBC
2002 to 2003	Royal Horticultural Society	B&Q (from 2003)
2004 to 2006	Royal Horticultural Society	B&Q
2007 to 2009	Royal Horticultural Society	Shredded Wheat
2011 to 2011	Royal Horticultural Society	Anglian Windows
2012 -	Royal Horticultural Society	No main sponsor

In 2017, after winning Britain in Bloom Champion of Champions, Elswick admitted to having previously cheated in the competition three years earlier. The volunteers engaged a specialist company to design a display which came in ready assembled trays.

Paul Hayhurst, Chairman of Elswick Parish Council and Elswick in Bloom co-ordinator, said "This result is entirely down to the hard work of volunteers in Elswick who have transformed our village". The Parish Council accounts for 2017-18 contradict this statement though as they show the local lengthsman was paid £3,500 to plant summer plants.

In September 2025, Paul Hayhurst, who had remained as Elswick in Bloom co-ordinator, informed the public that Elswick would no longer be entering the competition. Paul Hayhurst stated that the chairman of North West in Bloom has been "quite rude" when he came to judge the village. Elswick were later withdrawn from the competition before the results were announced.

== Structure ==
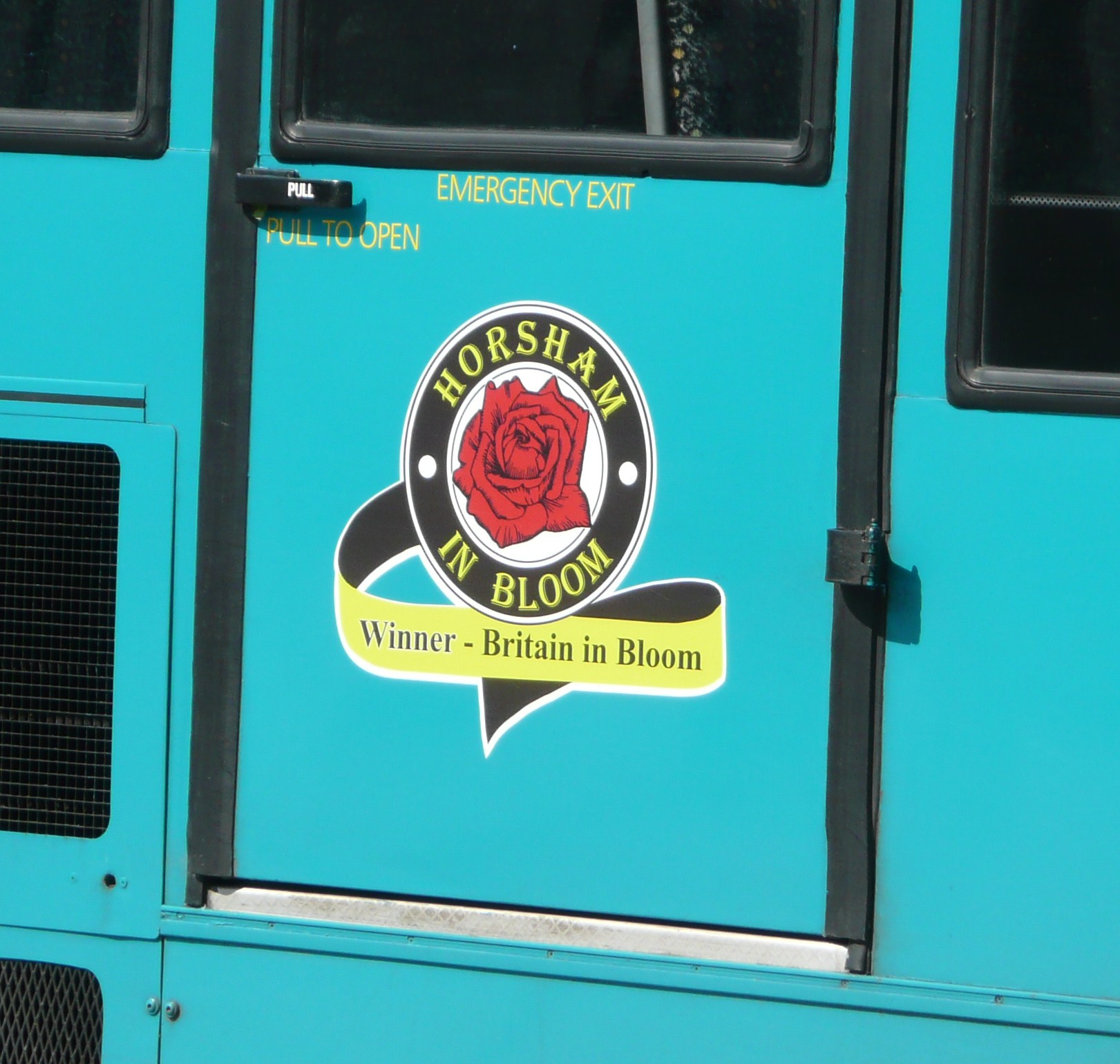
An emblem on the side of an Arriva bus, celebrating Horsham's 2007 victory in the Small City/Large Town category

The competition currently has twelve entry categories, most of which are determined by population size. Within each category, similarly sized communities compete across a spectrum of horticultural endeavour, community participation and environmental responsibility, which includes dealing with issues of litter, graffiti and vandalism.

- Category A
  - Small Village
  - Village
  - Large Village
- Category B
  - Small Town
  - Town
  - Large Town
- Category C
  - Small City
  - City
  - Large City
- Category D
  - Urban Community
- Category E
  - Small Coastal (electoral roll up to 12K)
  - Large Coastal (electoral roll over 12K)

== Judging ==
RHS Britain in Bloom encompasses 18 Regions/ Nations (12 English regions, as well as Scotland, Wales, Northern Ireland, Isle of Man, Jersey and Guernsey).

Judging takes place over two years in two stages:

1. Regional competition: Entries are first submitted by voluntary local 'Bloom' Committees, depending upon the area, to Local Authorities, Town or Parish Councils. These communities take part in their regional competition, for example South West in Bloom. The local volunteers are colloquially known as "bloomers". Judging takes place in June/July, and winners are announced during local presentations between August and November.
1. UK-wide: After the judging of the regional stage, Committees representing their nation/region select entrants for the second UK-wide stage. To ensure that effort is sustained over time, this second stage of judging takes place in August the year after they qualify. Winners of the UK judging are announced at a prestigious ceremony in September/October.

== National winners ==
=== 2020 to 2022 ===
KEY
Winner Known
Category Dormant
Category Not Created/No longer exists
Winner unknown/Not known if category exists

Year	Champion of Champions	Large City	City	Small City	Large Town	Town	Small Town	Large Village	Village	Small Village	Urban Community	Business Improvement District	Coastal Resort	
Year	Champion of Champions	Large City	City	Small City	Large Town	Town	Small Town	Large Village	Village	Small Village	Urban Community	Business Improvement District	Coastal up to 12K	Coastal over 12K
2022	Amersham		Rochdale	Dunstable	Amersham	Randalstown	Cullybackey	Cullybackey Community Partnership				Ulverston		North Berwick
2021												Weymouth		
2020														

=== 2010 to 2019 ===
Year	Champion of Champions	Large City	City	Small City	Large Town	Town	Small Town	Large Village	Village	Small Village	Urban Community	Business Improvement District	Coastal Resort	
Year	Champion of Champions	Large City	City	Small City	Large Town	Town	Small Town	Large Village	Village	Small Village	Urban Community	Business Improvement District	Coastal up to 12K	Coastal over 12K
2019	Perth					Amersham	Goring-on-Thames		Green Moor			Bath, Somerset & Canary Wharf		Llandudno
2018	Truro		Aberdeen		Perth			Royal Hillsborough			Halesowen			
2017	Elswick													
2016	Ahoghill	Wigan	Aberdeen	Harrogate	Coleraine	Haddington	Freckleton	Hillsborough	Castlecaulfield and Elswick, joint winners	not awarded	Kippax, Leeds	not awarded	St Brelade, Jersey	Southport
2015	Norton in Hales	Birmingham	Dundee	Bury	St Helier, Jersey	Falmouth	Ahoghill	Coupar Angus	Spofforth	Wolfscastle	Woodlesford	London Bridge	St Pierre du Bois, Guernsey	Cleethorpes
2014	Shrewsbury	Sunderland	Oldham	Bath	Truro	Shevington & District and Halstead, joint winners	Dunnington	Hillsborough	Moorsholm and Norton in Hales, joint winners	Bray Village	Port Marine & Village Quarter (Portishead)		Hunstanton	St Peter Port
2013	Lytham	Edinburgh	London Borough of Richmond upon Thames and Stockton-on-Tees, joint winners	Shrewsbury	Biddulph	Morpeth	Ahoghill	Coupar Angus	Pembridge	Barton in Fabis and Scarva, joint winners	Woolton (Liverpool)		Aberdour Village and Dartmouth, joint winners	Prestatyn
2012	Broughshane	Birmingham	Oldham	Loughborough	Belper	Halstead	Wimborne	Market Bosworth	Spofforth	Stanghow	Chirk (Wales) and Kippax (Leeds), joint winners		Lytham and North Berwick	Herne Bay
2011	Cricklade	Bristol	Stockton-on-Tees	Derry	Glenrothes	Rustington	St Martin, Guernsey	Broughshane	Luddenden	Loughgall	Uddingston		Whitby	Cleethorpes
2010	Falkland	Sunderland	Tameside	Crawley	Perth	City of London	Garstang	Comrie	Norton in Hales	Stanghow and Wolfscastle	Beighton, Sheffield		North Berwick	Scarborough, North Yorkshire

=== 2000 to 2009 ===
Year	Champion of Champions	Large City	City	Small City	Large Town	Town	Small Town	Small Country Town	Large Village	Village	Small Village	Urban Regeneration	Urban Community	Coastal Resort	
Year	Champion of Champions	Large City	City	Small City	Large Town	Town	Small Town	Small Country Town	Large Village	Village	Small Village	Urban Regeneration	Urban Community	Coastal up to 12K	Coastal over 12K
2009	Falkland	London Borough of Croydon	Stockton-on-Tees	Harrogate	Wisbech	Thornbury	Pitlochry		Broughshane, Northern Ireland	Chipping, Lancashire	Tarrington Village		Birmingham City Centre	St Brelade, Jersey	Cleethorpes
2008	Nottingham	Sheffield	Solihull	Taunton	Perth	Forres	Cricklade		Falkland, Scotland	Earsdon	Ravenfield	Chapelfield, Norwich	Clifton Village, Bristol	Herm, Guernsey	Exmouth
2007	Broughshane, Northern Ireland	Nottingham, East Midlands	Stockton-on-Tees, County Durham	Horsham, South East England	Bury St Edmunds, Anglia	Oakham, East Midlands	Grouville, Jersey		Comrie, Scotland	Darley, Yorkshire	Nominations but No Winners	St Philip's & St Paul's Floral Trail, Heart of England	Uddingston, Scotland	Cleethorpes, East Midlands	
2006	Alness, Scotland	No Nominations	Aberdeen, Scotland	Shrewsbury, Heart of England	Perth, Scotland	Brightlingsea, Anglia	St Martin's Parish, Guernsey		Broughshane, Northern Ireland	Norton in Hales, Heart of England	Ravenfield	Seedley and Langworthy, North West England	Starbeck, Yorkshire	Scarborough, Yorkshire	
2005		Cardiff	Derry	Newcastle-under-Lyme	Durham	Hexham	Garstang		Usk	Heysham	Bray	St Philip's & St Paul's Floral Trail, Birmingham	Spondon in Derby	Sidmouth	
2004		Stockport	Derby	Bath	Perth	Ilkley	Alness		Broughshane	Appleton Wiske	Sorn	Coventry City Centre	Dyce	St Ives and Carbis Bay	Bridlington
2003		Nottingham	Cheltenham	Harrogate		Barnstaple	Ledbury	Pitlochry	Darley Dale	Drumnadrochit	Unknown	Unknown	The Mumbles	Filey	Eastbourne
2002		Bournemouth	Oxford	Perth		Bridgnorth	Alness	Garstang	Broughshane	Filby	Unknown	Unknown	Blackley	Herm	Southport
2001		Nottingham	Bath; Durham	St. Helier, Jersey		Dungannon	Sidmouth	Pitlochry	Comrie	Thorpe Salvin	Unknown	Unknown	Port Sunlight	Unknown	Unknown
2000		Sunderland	Unknown	Perth		Unknown	Unknown	Pateley Bridge & Bewerley	Bampton	Beddgelert	Scarva	Unknown	Unknown	Unknown	Unknown

=== 1964 to 1999 ===
Details to 1990 from Graham Ashworth CBE, Britain in Bloom, The Tidy Britain Group (Wigan:1991)

KEY
Winner Known
Category Dormant
Category Not Created/No longer exists
Winner unknown/Not known if category exists

Year	Large City	City	Small City	Large Town	Town	Small Town	Small Country Town	Large Village	Village	Small Village	Urban Regeneration	Urban Community	Coastal Resort	
Year	Large City	City	Small City	Large Town	Town	Small Town	Small Country Town	Large Village	Village	Small Village	Urban Regeneration	Urban Community	Coastal up to 12K	Coastal over 12K
1999	Unknown	Unknown	Unknown		Barnstaple	Forres	Pitlochry	Broughshane	Beddgelert	Unknown	Unknown	Unknown	Unknown	Unknown
1998	Unknown	Woking	Perth		Alcester	Alness	Waringstown	Bampton	Unknown	Unknown	Unknown	Unknown	Unknown	Unknown
1997	Nottingham	Unknown	Unknown		Barnstaple	Moira	Unknown	Broughshane	Unknown	Unknown	Unknown	Unknown	Unknown	Unknown
1996	Unknown	Unknown	Unknown		Unknown	Unknown	Unknown	Unknown	Beddgelert	Unknown	Unknown	Unknown	Unknown	Unknown
1995	Unknown	Bath	Perth		Barnstaple	Unknown	Unknown	Unknown	Beddgelert	Unknown	Unknown	Unknown	Unknown	Unknown
1994	Unknown	Bath	Unknown		Unknown	Unknown	Unknown	Unknown	Unknown	Unknown	Unknown	Unknown	Unknown	Unknown
1993	Unknown	Unknown	Perth		Unknown	Moira	Unknown	Broughshane & Bampton	Beddgelert	Unknown	Unknown	Unknown	Unknown	Unknown
1992	Unknown	Unknown	Harrogate		Unknown	Unknown	Unknown	Saintfield	Unknown	Unknown	Unknown	Unknown	Unknown	Unknown
1991	Unknown	Unknown	Guildford		Unknown	Unknown	Unknown	Bampton	Unknown	Unknown	Unknown	Unknown	Unknown	Unknown
1990	Westminster	Bath	Whickham		Ilkley	Moira		Saintfield	Catcott			Walbottle		
1989	Oxford	Telford	Falkirk		Forres			Bampton	St. Florence					
1988	Cardiff	Cheltenham	Bury		Kelso			Market Bosworth	Llandinam					
1987		Aberdeen	Douglas, Isle of Man		Stratford upon Avon			Lympstone	Lund					
1986		Shrewsbury	Harrogate		Forres			Usk	Sampford Courtenay					
1985		Cheltenham	Crewe & Torquay		Moira			Lympstone	Lund					
1984		Bath	Whickham		Sidmouth			Pateley Bridge with Bewerley	Sampford Courtenay					
1983		Swansea	Harrogate		Kelso				Lympstone					
1982		Middlesbrough	Eastbourne		Forres				Lund					
1981		Bath	Harrogate		Sidmouth				Pateley Bridge with Bewerley & St. John's Town of Dalry					
1980		Exeter	Douglas, Isle of Man		Ryton				Killingworth					
1979		Aberdeen	Harrogate		Falmouth & St Andrews				Holywell Village, Northumberland.					
1978		Bath	Douglas, Isle of Man		Sidmouth				Aberdovey & Carrington					
1977		Aberdeen			Harrogate				Wolviston					
1976		Bath			Harrogate				Bampton					
1975		Bath			Sidmouth				Clovelly					
1974		Aberdeen & City of London			Shrewsbury				Clovelly					
1973		Aberdeen			Bridlington & Falmouth				Ryton					
1972		Bath and Hartlepool			Ayr				Chagford					
1971		Aberdeen			Falmouth				Abington					
1970		Aberdeen			Falmouth				Abington					
1969		Aberdeen; Overall National Winners												
1968		Bath; Overall National Winners												
1967		City of London; Overall National Winners												
1966		Exeter & Middlesbrough; Joint Overall National Winners												
1965		Aberdeen; Overall National Winners												
1964		Bath; Overall National Winners												

== Subsequent competitions ==
From the winners and finalists of RHS Britain in Bloom, entries are picked to represent Britain in international competitions such as the Entente Florale.

== Discretionary awards ==
(Definition Source) (Definition Source)

- The Britain in Bloom Horticulture Award ^{(from 2012)} / previously The Britain in Bloom Floral Award / The Asmer Trophy: Presented to the finalist that demonstrates the best horticultural displays throughout the entry.
- The Environment Award ^{(from 2014)} / previously The Sustainable Landscaping Award ^{(from 2010)} / previously The Permanent Landscaping Award / Beautiful Britain Award^{(from 1983)}/Landscape Development Trophy^{(to 1983)}: Presented to the finalist that demonstrates innovative and high quality sustainable landscaping practices within their entry. (Sustainable landscaping referring to creating an attractive environment that is in balance with the local climate and requires minimal resource input.)
- The Community Award ^{(from 2002)} : Presented to the finalist deemed to have best demonstrated that community involvement in their local "in Bloom" campaign is representative of all sectors of the community.
- Community Champion Award / previously The Bob Hare Award^{(from 1980 to 1990)} : Presented to individuals who demonstrate exceptional commitment and dedication to the Britain in Bloom cause in their community.
- Commercial Award / Gordon Ford Trophy: Presented to the finalist that demonstrates the best environmental and/or horticultural contribution from business / retail / corporate interests. Originally presented by Gordon Ford.
- Pride of Place Award^{(from 2012)} / previously Environmental Quality Award / Tidy Britain Group Trophy / Keep Britain Tidy Trophy / The Keep Britain Tidy Award: Presented to the finalist that best demonstrates duty and commitment to any one or more of the following: cleanliness, effective use of resources and maintenance of hard landscaping and street furniture.
- Tourism Award: Presented to the finalist that demonstrates the most effective use of their local "in Bloom" initiatives as a means of encouraging and supporting tourism in their area.
- Best Public Park Award: Given in Memory of David Welch. Presented to the park (including publicly run pay-on-entry parks and gardens) designed for horticultural excellence, giving delight to the visitor through appropriate planting, high standards of maintenance, including infrastructure, conserving wildlife, cleanliness and features of interest.
- Conservation and Wildlife Award / previously The Going for Green Trophy: Presented to the finalist that best demonstrates commitment to sustainable development, including management of the flora and fauna in their local environment.
- Outstanding Contribution / previously The Moran Memorial Award: Presented to an individual(s) that judges consider to have made outstanding efforts towards the success and promotion of Britain in Bloom.
- No longer awarded: Best Inner City / Barratt Inner City Trophy: for the best effort in inner city areas
- Young People's Award ^{(from 2008)} : Presented to the finalist deemed to involve young people from across the community in the best way.
- School Award: Presented to the school within a finalist community that demonstrates the best commitment to on-going environmental and horticultural initiatives.
- Environmental Responsibility^{(from 2012)} : Presented to the finalist that best demonstrated responsible management of resources within their entry.
- RHS Britain in Bloom Heritage Award ^{(from 2012)} / previously Local Roots Award :Presented to the finalist that best demonstrated outstanding commitment to the ongoing care and development of their local heritage.

=== 1971 to 1999 ===
Year
1971

1972

1973

1974

1975

1976

1977

1978

1979

1980

1981

1982

1983

1984

1985

1986

1987

1988

1989

1990

1992

1996

1999

Horticulture	Environment	Community	Commercial	Pride of Place	Tourism	Best Public Park	Conservation and Wildlife	Outstanding Contribution	Best Inner City	Young People	Heritage
			Bath								
			Bath								
			Bath	Bridlington							
			Bath	Clovelly							
			City of London	London Borough of Camden							
			Bath	Wolviston				Mr C B Preece; West Country in Bloom			
			Bath	Exeter				Mr P Conn; Ex Parks Director, City of Liverpool			
			Swansea	Holywell				Dr D W Huebner; Chairman Yorkshire and Humberside in Bloom			
	Belfast		York	Douglas				Mr B Wolley; Chairman Northumberland in Bloom			
	Paisley	Belfast	Sidmouth	Forres							
	Stockport	Strathclyde	Bath	Largs				Mr H Parker; Assistant Director of Environment (Parks) Swansea City Council			
Swansea	Kirkcaldy	Harold Peirce, Arthur Allen, Brian Pattenden, Nigel Rogers - Eastbourne Parks Dept	Stratford upon Avon	Stratford upon Avon				(posthumous); Bob Hare			
Ryton	Aberdeen	Tevrnspite, Dyfed	Sidmouth	Cheltenham				David Welch; Director of Leisure and Recreation, Aberdeen			
Cheltenham	Forres	St. David's Centre, Cardiff	Nantwich	East Sleekburn				George Dick; Village orderly of Ballinamallard			
Douglas	Crewe	Tom Dobbins, Babbacombe Model Village, Devon	Torquay	Market Bosworth				Dr W Dally; Edzell			
Shrewsbury	Belfast	Walter Dinning, Parks Department, Gateshead	Nantwich	Sorn				Leonard Likorish former Director General of the British Tourist Authority			
Bath	Crewe	The Japanese Garden, Aberdeen	Stratford upon Avon	Bury St Edmunds				Jim Woods; Killyleagh			
Bury St Edmunds	Plymouth	Moffat	Gorey, Jersey	Exeter				Lewis McAvoy; Chief Technical Officer Lisburn Borough Council	Oxford		
Morpeth	Telford	Saintfield in Bloom Committee	Bournemouth	Moira				Muriel Preece; Organiser of West Country in Bloom	Leeds		
Southport	Swansea	Guildford	J Sainsbury plc	Nuneaton and Bedworth	Keswick			George Tomlinson; Crewe	Plymouth		
Bath											
									Nottingham		
									Nottingham, Hyson Green		

=== 2000 to 2009 ===
Year
2000
2001
2002
2003
2004
2005
2006
2007
2008
2009

Horticulture	Environment	Community	Commercial	Pride of Place	Tourism	Best Public Park	Conservation and Wildlife	Outstanding Contribution	Best Inner City	Young People	Heritage
									Portsmouth		
Bath	St. Helier - Harbour Approach		KeyMed, Southend on Sea	Newcastle upon Tyne	Lynton & Lynmouth	The Crichton Dumfries	Tatsfield	Pupils and teachers at Applegrove Primary School, Forres	Leeds		
Stafford	Oxford - Arlington Business Park	Saltburn by the Sea	Doxford International Business Park, Sunderland	Newcastle-under-Lyme - Meadows Residents Association	Drumnadrochit & Brighton and Hove	Johnston Park Aberdeen	London Borough of Bromley	Carolyn Wilson, Alness			
Falkland	Guildford	Coleraine	Normanton	Aberdeen	Barnstaple	Botanic Gardens Bath	Bury St. Edmunds	Malcolm Wood, Nottingham			
Perth	Sheffield - Peace Garden	Seedley and Langworthy (Salford)	Bracknell Flowers, Bracknell	Market Bosworth	Falkland	Jephson Gardens Royal Leamington Spa	Tilgate Centre, Crawley	Doug Stacey			Sheffield and Market Harborough
Nottingham	North Berwick	The Friends of Norwich in Bloom	Fareham Memorial Gardens	Manchester City Centre	Hexham	University Park Nottingham	Rottingdean	Jeanette Warke, Londonderry			
Shrewsbury	St. Helier - Waterfront	Falkland	Taylors of Harrogate, Starbeck	Norton in Hales	Scarborough	Greyfriars Green Coventry	Durlston Country Park, Swanage	Clifford Prout, Old Colwyn			
Grouville	Bury St. Edmunds and Abbots Green School	Nottingham	White Rose shopping centre, Beeston	Duffus and North Berwick	Cleethorpes	Mount Edgcumbe Park Plymouth	Cardiff Bay	Christel MacIntosh, Alness			
Perth	Sheffield	Cricklade	Ocean Road, South Shields	Sheffield	Douglas, Isle of Man	Ravelin Park Southsea	North Meadow, Cricklade	Terry Bane		Applegrove School, Forres	
Rustington	Bangor - Bangor Walled Garden	Earsdon	St. Brelade's Bay Hotel	St Andrew's, Scotland	Chipping, Lancashire	Harrogate - Valley Gardens	Farthing Downs and New Hill, London Borough of Croydon	Vic Verrier		Falkland	Eston, North Yorkshire and Plymouth

=== 2010 to 2016 ===
Year
2010
2011
2012
2013
2014

Horticulture	Environment	Community	Commercial	Pride of Place	Tourism	Best Public Park	Conservation and Wildlife	Outstanding Contribution	Young People	School	Heritage	Environmental Responsibility
Coleraine	City of London	Crawley	Beighton, Sheffield	Tameside	Harrogate	Bristol Zoo	Solihull	Ken Powles and Susan Smith	Douglas, Isle of Man	Portchester Northern Community School, Fareham	Halstead	
Bury	University of Edinburgh - Pollock Campus	Chirk (Wrexham)	Graythwaite Manor Hotel, Grange over Sands	Derry City, Ulster	Tenby, Wales	Royal Botanic Gardens, Edinburgh	Avon Gorge & Downs, Bristol	Jim Knight	Wee FIBbees, Forres, Scotland	Spring Common School, Moor (Huntingdon)		
Birmingham	St Helier, Jersey	Loughborough	Hendra Caravan Park, Newquay	Oldham	Joint winners: Herm, Guernsey; and Great Yarmouth	Cannon Hill Park, Birmingham	Kippax (Leeds)	John Woodward and Clive Addison	Joint winners: St George's Crypt, Leeds; and Stone, Staffordshire	St Bede's Catholic High School, Lytham	Chirk (Wrexham)	Thornbury Community Composting Site, Thornbury
Glenrothes	Diamond Jubilee Gardens, London Borough of Richmond upon Thames	Biddulph, Coupar Angus, Edinburgh, Hunmanby, Prestatyn, Stanghow and Starbeck	Sanderson Arcade and Bus Station, Morpeth	Stockton-on-Tees	Bournemouth	The Dingle, Shrewsbury	Saint Brélade	Alan Heath, Cumbria, Maurice Baren, Yorkshire and Patsy Clark MBE, Northumbria	Dartmouth, Morpeth and Prestatyn	Oakley School, Tunbridge Wells	Eston (Middlesbrough)	Bury
Oldham	London Bridge	Truro	Stockley Park, Hillingdon	Port Marine & Village Quarter (Portishead)	Shrewsbury	Roundhay Park, Leeds	Tresco	Walter Dinning and Mark Wasilewski MVO	Immingham	Joint winners: St Mary's School, Dalton with Newton, and Edith Cavell Academy and Nursery School, Norwich	Pitlochry	

== Regions ==
There are 18 Regions/ Nations "in Bloom", each of which coordinate regional campaigns in their area. The regions of the UK and Crown dependencies used in the competition are (with reference to ceremonial counties and government office regions):

Country or Region within the U.K.	Region	Name	Notes
England	Anglia (East of England region)	Anglia in Bloom	
England	Cumbria	Cumbria in Bloom	
England	East Midlands (as region)	East Midlands in Bloom	
England	Heart of England	Heart of England in Bloom	Heart of England includes Gloucestershire (minus South Gloucestershire), Herefordshire, Shropshire, Staffordshire, Warwickshire, West Midlands, and Worcestershire
England	London	London in Bloom	
England	Northumbria (as North East England)	Northumbria in Bloom	
England	North West England	North West in Bloom	(as region, less Cumbria)
England	South East England	South & South East in Bloom	(East Sussex, Kent, West Sussex, Surrey)
England	South West England	Southwest in Bloom	(Bristol, Cornwall, Devon, western Dorset, Somerset, South Gloucestershire, most of Wiltshire)
England	Southern England	South & South East in Bloom	(eastern Dorset, Hampshire, Isle of Wight, southern Wiltshire)
England	Thames and Chilterns	Thames & Chilterns in Bloom	(Berkshire, Buckinghamshire, Oxfordshire)
England	Yorkshire	Yorkshire in Bloom	
Northern Ireland	Ulster (Northern Ireland)	Ulster in Bloom	(Competition does not include all of Ulster; only includes Northern Ireland)
Scotland	Scotland	Beautiful Scotland	
Wales	Wales	Wales in Bloom	
Isle of Man	Isle of Man	Isle of Man in Bloom	Campaign is temporarily suspended (2011)
Guernsey	Guernsey	Floral Guernsey	
Jersey	Jersey	Jersey in Bloom	

== RHS It's Your Neighbourhood ==
RHS It's Your Neighbourhood is part of the wider RHS Britain in Bloom initiative, helping volunteer-led groups to improve their local area. Any group can take part, as long as it is volunteer-led and involved in hands-on community gardening. It should also be working with the community for the benefit of the community. Participating groups care for all sorts of spaces - from local parks and gardens, to odd grot-spots which have been transformed and shared residential spaces or alleyways.

The campaign was launched by the RHS in 2006 to support grassroots community gardening and there are currently more than 1,300 registered groups. ^{(2012)}

The initiative works around the same three pillars of assessment as RHS Britain in Bloom: Community Participation, Gardening Achievement and Environmental Responsibility; however, it is not a competitive campaign. Participating groups receive an annual visit from an It's Your Neighbourhood assessor, who provides feedback and tips for how to develop projects, and each group receives a certificate of achievement from the RHS.

It's Your Neighbourhood is free to enter and open to groups of all sizes.

== Source of civic pride ==
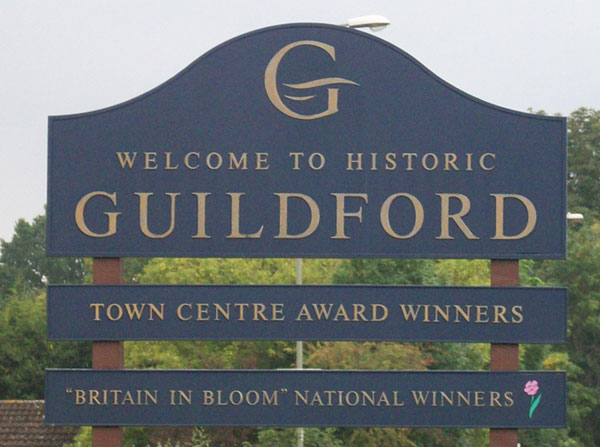
Guildford welcome sign displaying Britain in Bloom credentials

Winning a category within Britain in Bloom at a national or even regional level has proved to be a source of considerable civic pride for the towns, cities and villages involved. Many of the authorities of the winning locations do advertise their achievements on signs within, or more predominantly on the outskirts of their settlement. One journalist stated that "Since Britain In Bloom began in 1963 … nothing has pleased town councillors more than to hammer up a sign at the outskirts of their kingdom trumpeting superiority to incoming visitors… Few events provide a sterner test of civic pride." Examples include Garstang where the sign that leads to the high street at the heart of the town says, above the name "Garstang", Britain In Bloom Small Town – Gold Award Winners 2002, 2005, and "Invitation Finalists to Champion of Champions 2006", or Guildford, which advertises its past triumph in the Town category on its welcome signs.
