= Black Moss Covert Nature Reserve =

Nature reserve in Greater Manchester, England

Coordinates: 53.3961°N 2.3845°W

Black Moss Covert Nature Reserve is a 2.1 hectare nature reserve in England managed by the Cheshire Wildlife Trust. It is a Site of Biological Importance and is located on Carrington Moss, two kilometres west of Altrincham town centre (grid reference SJ745889).

== Description ==
A small flat birch-dominated woodland with a good circular path around it, the site has a public footpath running immediately past the entrance as well as a connecting path running from the Pennine Way. The site has a large count of bramble species (14) and a varied ground flora that includes remote sedge, bluebell, wood avens and dog rose. The woodland is very good for fungi with candle snuff fungus, fly agaric and common puff ball among the fruiting bodies seen. Butterflies include the speckled wood, common brimstone and peacock whilst the normal array of birds common to such habitat can also be found such as long-tailed tit, jay, wren and treecreeper.
