= St George's Church, Carrington =

Coordinates: 53.4300°N 2.4110°W

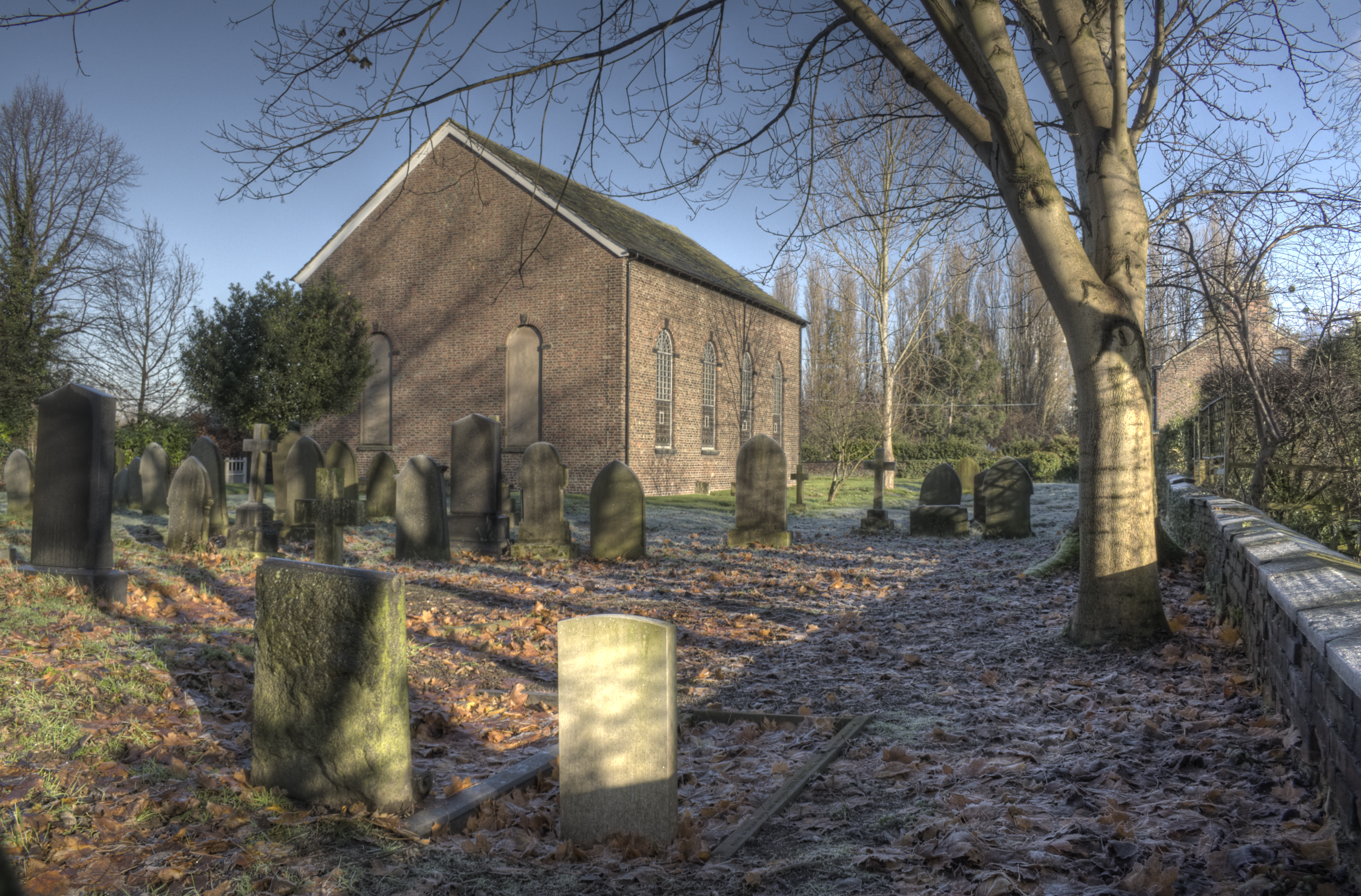
- St George's Church, Carrington. In foreground is CWGC headstone of a World War I soldier buried here.

- Location in Greater Manchester
- OS grid reference: SJ 728 926
- Location: Carrington, Trafford, Greater Manchester
- Country: England
- Denomination: Anglican

Architecture
- Functional status: Redundant
- Heritage designation: Grade II*
- Designated: 5 March 1959
- Architectural type: Church
- Groundbreaking: 1757
- Completed: 1872

Specifications
- Materials: Brick with stone slate roof

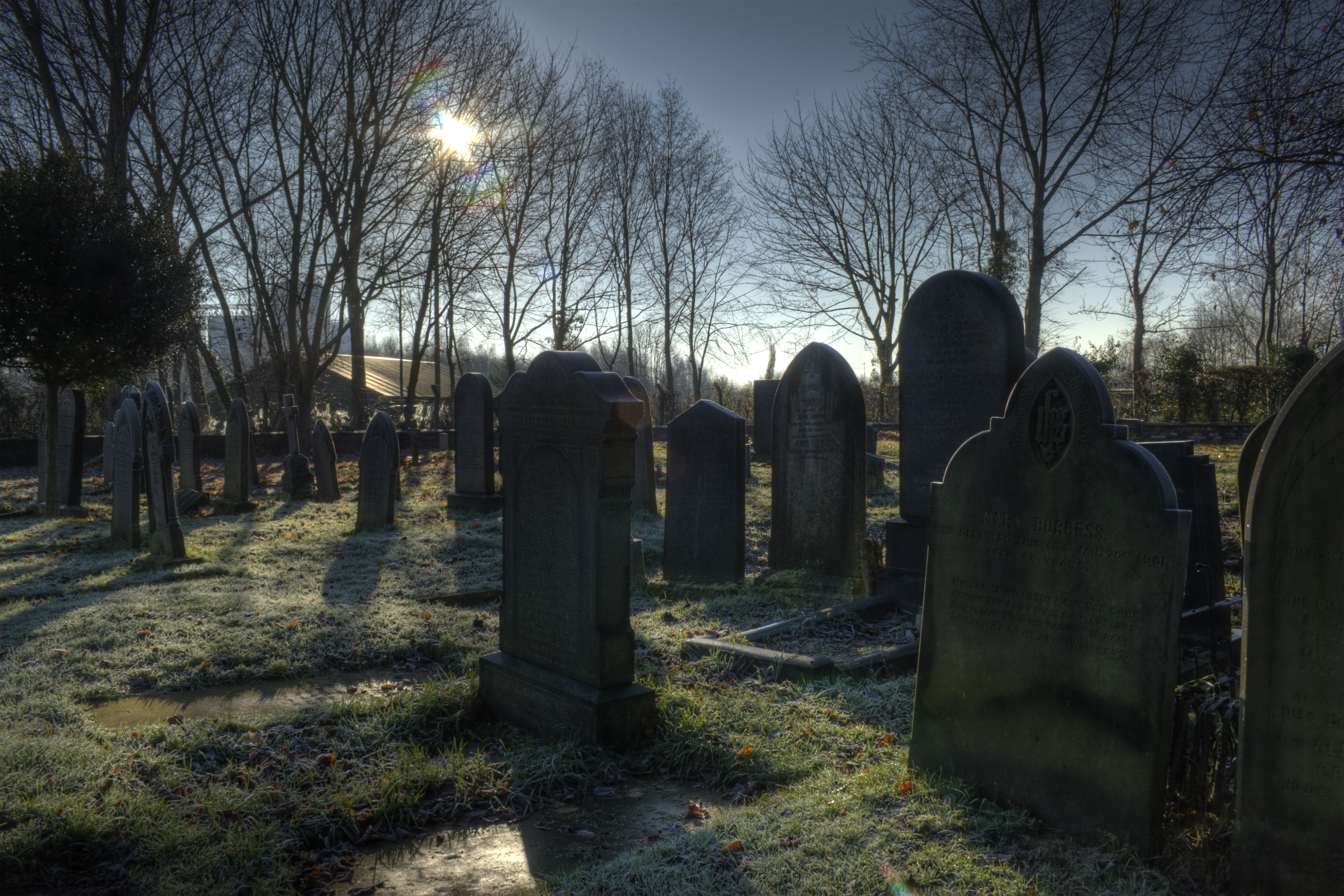
The graveyard, cleared of overgrowth in 2008.

St George's Church is in the village of Carrington, Trafford, Greater Manchester, England. It is recorded in the National Heritage List for England as a designated Grade II* listed building, but is now redundant and in the care of the Churches Conservation Trust. It stands in a relatively isolated position south of the Manchester Ship Canal, along the northern edge of the Carrington Moss industrial estate.

== History ==
The church was built by Isaac Shaw in 1757–59 for Mary, Countess of Stamford as a chapel of ease to serve the hamlets of Partington and Carrington. A chancel was added in 1872. The building is no longer used for worship. St George's was vested in the Trust on 1 March 1990.

The vicar of St Mary's, Partington and Carrington is responsible for the churchyard. Clearance work in 2008 uncovered the graves of two soldiers who had died during the First World War. Their graves are registered by the Commonwealth War Graves Commission.

== Architecture ==
The church is built in brick with a stone slate roof. The plan consists of a four-bay nave with a small chancel. Each bay has a round-arched window. The chancel has a Venetian window and a hipped roof. Formerly a cupola was on the west end but this has been removed.

The box pews, including two family pews, are original. The font is based on a marble wash bowl. The wooden reredos dates from around 1872. The pulpit is a three-decker.

== See also ==
- Grade II* listed buildings in Greater Manchester
- Listed buildings in Carrington, Greater Manchester
- List of churches in Greater Manchester
- List of churches preserved by the Churches Conservation Trust in Northern England
