= Carrington training ground =

Carrington training ground can refer to:

- the training ground of Manchester United F.C. at the Trafford Training Centre
- the training ground of Manchester City F.C. at the Carrington Training Centre
- the training ground of Sale Sharks rugby club
