= Wilson Bowden =

British company

- Industry: Housebuilding
- Founded: 1961; 65 years ago
- Defunct: 2007; 19 years ago
- Fate: Acquired
- Successor: Barratt Developments
- Headquarters: Coalville, England
- Key people: David Wilson (Chairman)

Wilson Bowden plc was a British housebuilding and general construction company headquartered in Coalville in central England.

== History ==
Wilson Bowden was the holding company for David Wilson Homes and its commercial property subsidiary, Wilson Bowden Properties, the name being adopted at the time of the group's flotation in 1987. David Wilson joined his father’s joinery workshop in 1960 and during that decade gradually moved the business into housebuilding. By the early 1970s, AH Wilson (as it was then named) was building around 150 houses per year in the Leicestershire area. A joint property investment with First National Financial Corporation, Bowden Park Holdings, was wholly acquired in 1973 shortly after First National got into financial difficulty.

David Wilson expanded substantially in the 1980s with sales rising from 300 to 1,600 within the decade. The firm's financial reports for 1989 included a record pre-tax profit of £40.3 million, being one of a few house builders that were able to increase profits that year. On the back of strong fiscal performance came rights issues to raise funds from investors for further growth. Wilson Bowden was not heavily impacted by the early 1990s recession, unlike several of its competitors, an outcome that was attributed to the firm's relatively conservative land buying practices. During 1993, the firm announced that house sales had risen by roughly 50 percent year-on-year.

During the mid 1990s, Wilson Bowden started to expand beyond its East Midlands heartland. New offices were opened in the West Midlands, Hereford, Hertfordshire and Kent in 1992; Leeds in 1993; Cheshire in 1997 and Glasgow in 1999. Wilson also completed several strategic acquisitions, such as the Berkshire-based firm Trencherwood in 1996, which had a dominant position in the West Berkshire land market, the long-established housing business of Henry Boot plc in 2003, and the North West-centric developor Roland Bardsley Homes in 2006.

By the end of 1990s, Wilson was building over 4,000 units per year and was regarded as one of the most consistently successful of the quoted housebuilders. Under a plan to double its prefabrication capacity, Wilson Bowden constructed its own factory in the early 2000s.

David Wilson ran the business for forty years. During the early 2000s, extensive efforts were put into implementing a controlled succession strategy. It was ultimately decided to put the company's ownership up for auction, the multistage process of which attracted the interest of numerous parties, including rival construction company George Wimpey and a consortium headed by the Scottish billionaire Tom Hunter. During April 2007, just months prior to the opening events of the Great Recession, the company was purchased by Barratt Developments in exchange for £2.2 billion; the move made Barrett the biggest homebuilder in Britain, employing roughly 7,500 people at the time of the acquisition. Within one month of the sale being finalised, David Wilson had retired while the closure of several of the company's offices, the sale of its in-house plumbing and plant hire divisions as well as the discontinuation of its KingsOak Homes brand, had been announced; however, Barrett decided to retain the Wilson Bowden name for some activities.

== Operations ==
The company had three divisions:

- David Wilson Homes: a general housebuilder that operated in most parts of England, Scotland and Wales
- Wilson City Homes: constructed urban residential buildings
- Wilson Bowden Developments Limited: undertook retail, leisure, industrial and office development projects
