= Birch Moss Covert Nature Reserve =

Nature reserve in Greater Manchester, England

Coordinates: 53.414°N 2.379°W

Birch Moss Covert Nature Reserve is a nature reserve managed by the Cheshire Wildlife Trust. It is located on Carrington Moss, north of Sinderland Lane, which runs off the A56 road at Broadheath, Greater Manchester (grid reference SJ749908).

== Description ==
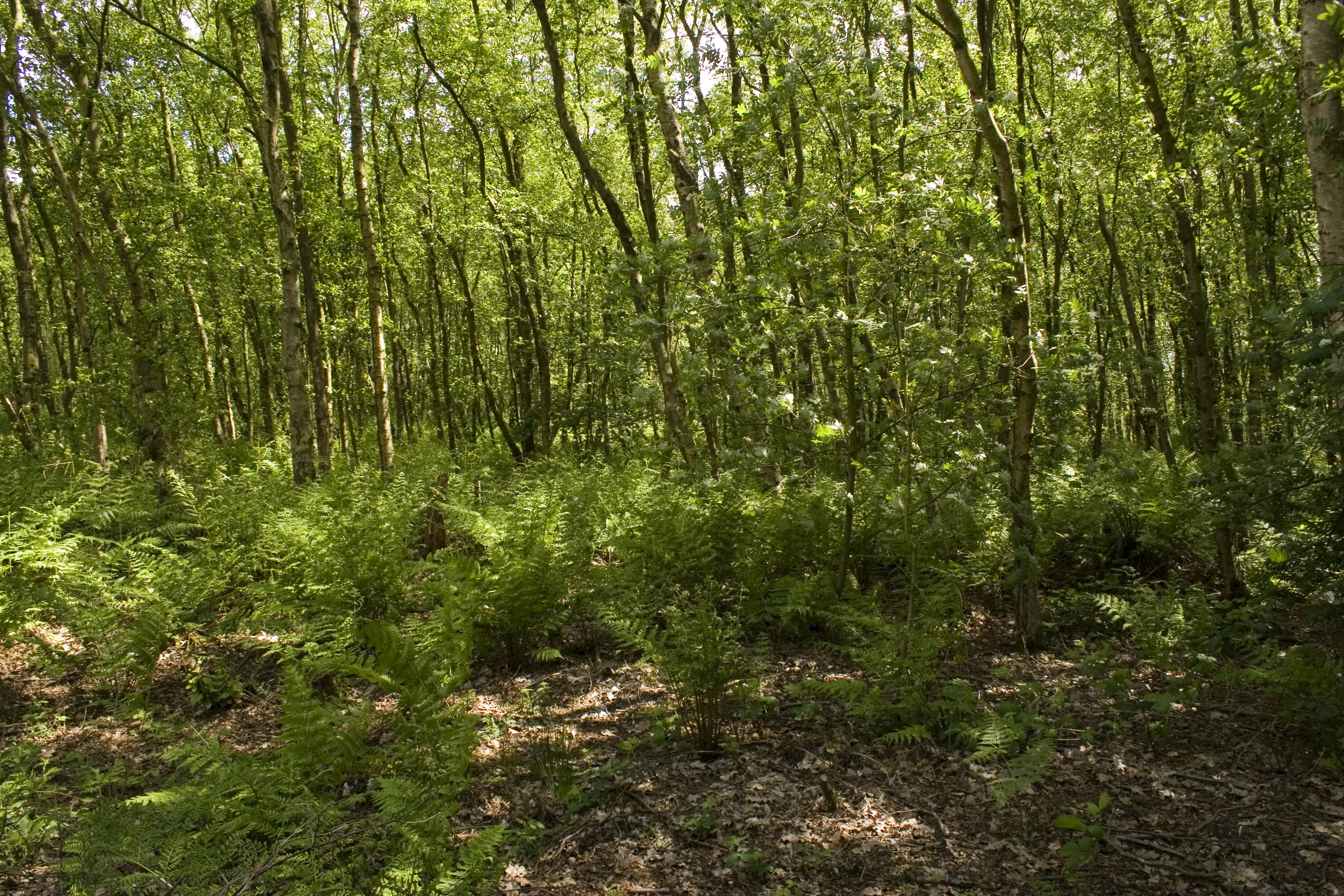
Birch Moss Covert

A large block of woodland for this area of south Manchester, the covert lies on a remnant of the peaty soil that once made up the extensive Carrington Moss. As the name implies, the wood is dominated by birch, with rowan and young sapling oak starting to establish. The stand is relatively even-aged with some glades and rides cut into it to try to break up the canopy and provide edge for species such as speckled wood butterfly. In places small patches of heather still occur where more light can penetrate through the leaf. The site is very good for birds such as long-tailed tits and for many varied species of fungus.
