= Listed buildings in Carrington, Greater Manchester =

Carrington is a civil parish in the Metropolitan Borough of Trafford, Greater Manchester, England. It contains three listed buildings that are recorded in the National Heritage List for England. Of these, one is listed at Grade II*, the middle grade, and the others are at Grade II, the lowest grade. The parish contains the village of Carrington and the surrounding countryside. The listed buildings consist of a church, a house, and a farmhouse.

== Key ==
Grade	Criteria
II*	Particularly important buildings of more than special interest
II	Buildings of national importance and special interest

== Buildings ==
Name and location	Photograph	Date	Notes	Grade
St George's Church; 53.43008°N 2.41090°W		1757–59	The church, which is now redundant and under the care of the Churches Conservation Trust, is in brick with a stone-slate roof. It consists of a nave and a small chancel. The windows along the sides of the church have round heads, impost blocks and keystones. The doorway has a rusticated surround. The chancel has a hipped roof, and contains a Venetian window. Inside the church are box pews.	II*
Westwood Lodge; 53.43246°N 2.39442°W	—	1768	A rendered brick house on a projecting plinth, with a modillion eaves cornice and a slate roof. There two storeys, a double-depth plan, a symmetrical three-bay front, and extensions to the rear and to the right. The central bay projects slightly, and contains a recessed porch with impost blocks, a keystone, and an elliptical arch. The windows are casements with stone sills and keystone arches.	II
Ackers Farmhouse; 53.43242°N 2.36937°W	—	c. 1830	A brick farmhouse on a stone plinth, with an eaves gutter cornice and a slate roof. There are two storeys, a double-depth plan, a symmetrical front of three bays, and a rear wing. In the centre is a doorway with small side columns and a fanlight. Most of the windows are sashes, two have been replaced by casements, and the window above the doorway has a keystone. At the rear is an arched stair window.	II
