= David Welch (horticulturist) =

British horticulturist (1933–2000)

David Welch CBE
- Born: 13 December 1933; Burton Joyce, Nottinghamshire, England
- Died: 18 September 2000 (aged 66); Aberdeen, Scotland
- Education: University of Reading
- Spouse: Eva Doring (m. 1960)
- Children: 4
- Awards: Scottish Horticultural Medal; Associate of Honour

David Welch CBE (13 December 1933 – 18 September 2000) was a British horticulturist. He worked at local authorities in Blackpool and Bebington before working as Aberdeen Corporation's director of parks from 1967 for 22 years, during which he is credited with Aberdeen's success in the Britain in Bloom award. Following his departure from the council, he was chief executive of the Royal Parks Agency from 1992, where he notably oversaw the distribution of flowers left for Diana, Princess of Wales after her death.

The David Welch Winter Gardens in Duthie Park, Aberdeen, and Beautiful Scotland in Bloom's David Welch Memorial Award for Something Special are named after him.

== Early life and education ==
David Welch was born on 13 December 1933 in Burton Joyce, Nottinghamshire and he was raised by his mother from infancy along with his brother following his father's death. He had an eye condition which limited his close-range vision, influencing his choice of career as a gardener. He studied Parks and Recreation at the University of Reading.

== Career ==
In 1951, at the age of 16, Welch worked as an apprentice for Nottingham City Council, ultimately working in the parks department for nine years in total. In 1955, he started two years of training at Wisley Garden and from 1959, he worked at Blackpool. From May 1963, he worked at Bebington Corporation as the parks superindendent.

=== Aberdeen District Council ===
Welch became the director of parks at Aberdeen Corporation in August 1967. His proposal to replace plain turf with roses in Aberdeen's urban environment was initially met with resistance. It was ultimately implemented as the roses were cheaper and lower-maintenance. He would go on to be nicknamed Mr Roses for his work in the city.

During his time at the Corporation, later renamed the City of Aberdeen District Council, Aberdeen saw repeated success in the Britain in Bloom competition to the extent that its rules were amended disallowing entrants with two consecutive victories from receiving the award for a third time in a row. This led to an urban legend that Aberdeen had specifically been disqualified from the competition.

Welch resigned from the council in April 1989 following the introduction of competitive tendering, and subsequently worked as a horticultural consultant.

=== Royal Parks Agency ===
On 2 March 1992, he was appointed as chief executive of the Royal Parks Agency by the Secretary of State for the Environment Michael Heseltine. He was then a judge in that year's Britain in Bloom competition.

Following the death of Diana, Princess of Wales, he was in charge of redistributing flowers left by mourners, a process which involved volunteers from the Scouts and the WRVS due to the quantity of flowers present, with most being reused as compost while others were donated to care homes and hospitals. He was to play a key role in planning a memorial garden dedicated to Diana at Kensington Palace, her official residence, before plans for its creation were cancelled in late 1998.

He left the Royal Parks Agency in early 2000.

=== Later activities ===
Welch was a judge for the Beautiful Scotland in Bloom competition in July 2000. He continued to write for The Press and Journal, where he had a regular column as a gardening correspondent – his last article was published on 19 September.

== Awards ==
In January 1975, the Royal Caledonian Horticultural Society presented Welch with the Scottish Horticultural Medal.

In January 1990, he was given the Associate of Honour award by the Royal Horticultural Society. Later that year on 4 July, he was presented with an honorary LLD from the University of Aberdeen.

On 15 December 1999, he was appointed a Commander of the Most Excellent Order of the British Empire.

== Personal life ==
Welch met Eva Doring while working at Wisley Garden and they married in 1960. They had four children.

== Death and legacy ==
David Welch died at Aberdeen Royal Infirmary of leukaemia on 18 September 2000 and his funeral was held at St Machar's Cathedral on 23 September. The following Beautiful Scotland in Bloom competition in 2001 introduced the David Welch Memorial Award for Something Special, of which Alness was the inaugural holder. The Winter Gardens of Duthie Park were renamed the David Welch Winter Gardens in his honour in 2002.
