= Lawrie Barratt =

English accountant and businessman

Sir Lawrie Barratt
- Born: Lawrence Arthur Barratt; 14 November 1927; Newcastle upon Tyne, England, U.K.
- Died: 19 December 2012 (aged 85); Corbridge, England, U.K.
- Employer: Barratt Developments

Sir Lawrence Arthur Barratt (14 November 1927 – 19 December 2012) was an English accountant and businessman who founded Barratt Developments, one of the largest housebuilders in the United Kingdom.

== Career ==
Brought up in the North East of England, Barratt left school at 14 and initially trained as an accountant. Frustrated at the high purchase prices of houses for first-time buyers, in 1953 Barratt decided to go ahead and build his own house in Darras Hall.

Lawrie Barratt established Barratt Developments in 1958. As chairman and chief executive and by extensive marketing he expanded it to become one of the largest housebuilders in the United Kingdom. Knighted in 1982, he retired from both roles in 1988 but in 1991 was called out of retirement, following the early 1990s recession, to take the role of chairman again and restore the fortunes of the business.

He retired for good in 1997 and lived in Corbridge. He died on 19 December 2012 at age 85.

He was knighted in the 1982 New Years Honours List.
