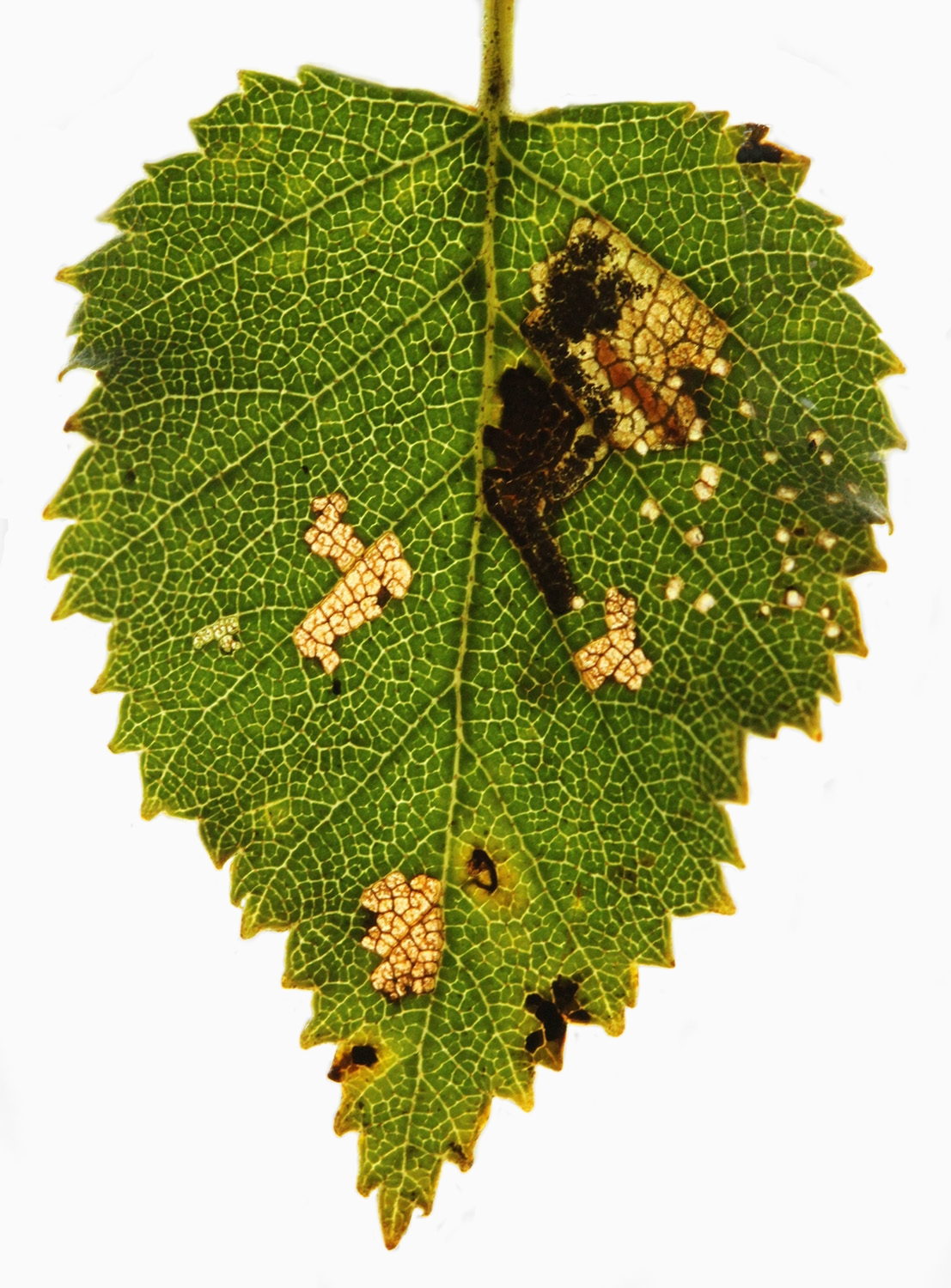

Scientific classification
- Kingdom: Animalia
- Phylum: Arthropoda
- Clade: Pancrustacea
- Class: Insecta
- Order: Lepidoptera
- Family: Nepticulidae
- Genus: Stigmella
- Species: S. continuella

Binomial name
- Stigmella continuella (Stainton, 1856)

Synonyms
- Nepticula continuella Stainton, 1856; Stigmella uigurica Puplesis, 1985

= Stigmella continuella =

Species of moth

Stigmella continuella is a moth of the family Nepticulidae. It is found from Fennoscandia to the Pyrenees, Alps and Hungary, and from Ireland to central Russia and Ukraine, east to the eastern part of the Palearctic realm.

The wingspan is 4–5 mm. The head is ferruginous-orange, the collar light yellowish. The antennal eyecaps are whitish-ochreous. The forewings are fuscous-bronze with a shining silvery fascia beyond middle, preceded by a rather dark purplish-fuscous fascia. The apical area beyond this is dark fuscous-purple. Hindwings grey.

Adults are on wing from May to August.

The larvae feed on Betula nana, Betula pendula and Betula pubescens. They mine the leaves of their host plant. The mine consists of a slender corridor. The first part is strongly contorted. The leaf tissue that is cut off is killed, resulting in a brown spot. Pupation takes place outside of the mine.
