= Barratt Redrow =

UK Residential property development company

Barratt Redrow plc
- Formerly: Barratt Developments Limited (1958–1981); Barratt Developments plc (1981–2024)
- Type: Public limited company
- Traded as: LSE: BTRW; FTSE 100 Component
- Industry: Housebuilding
- Founded: May 14, 1958; 68 years ago
- Headquarters: Coalville, England, UK
- Key people: Caroline Silver (Chairwoman); David Thomas (CEO)
- Revenue: ▲£6,055.0 million (2026)
- Operating income: ▲£444.3 million (2026)
- Net income: ▲£243.3 million (2026)
- Number of employees: 7,756 (2025)
- Website: www.barrattredrow.co.uk

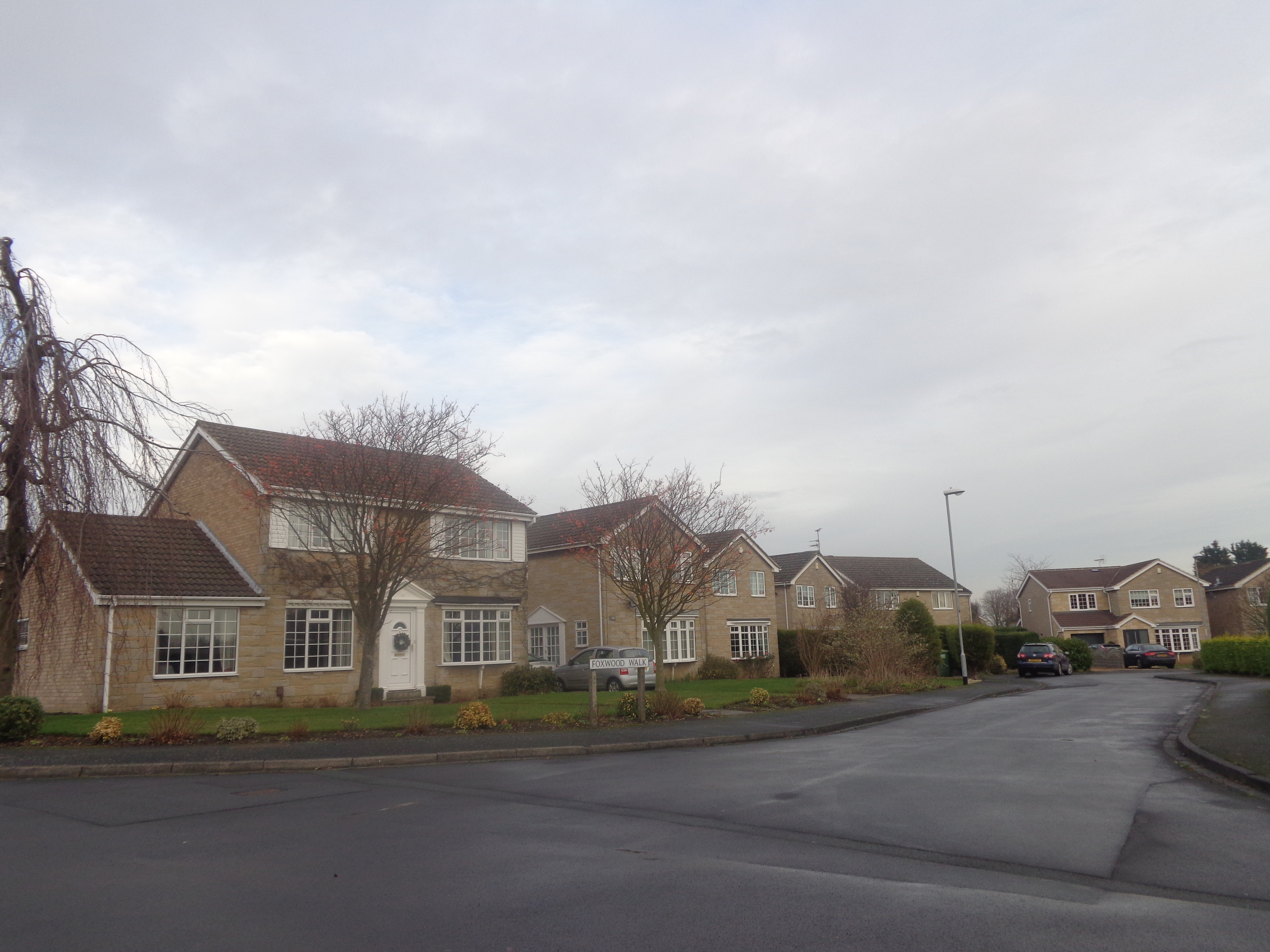
1970s Barratt housing in Wetherby, West Yorkshire.

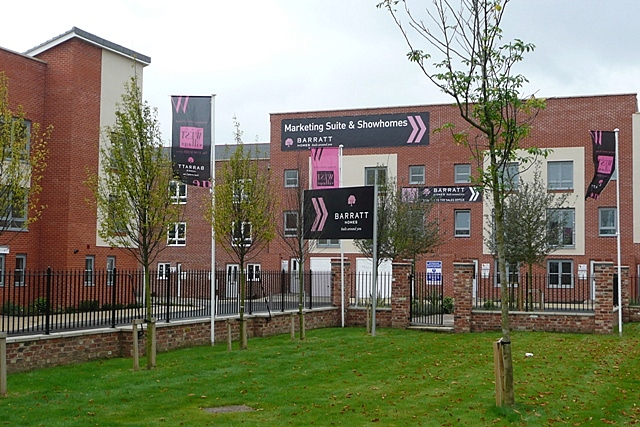
A Barratt development near Reading

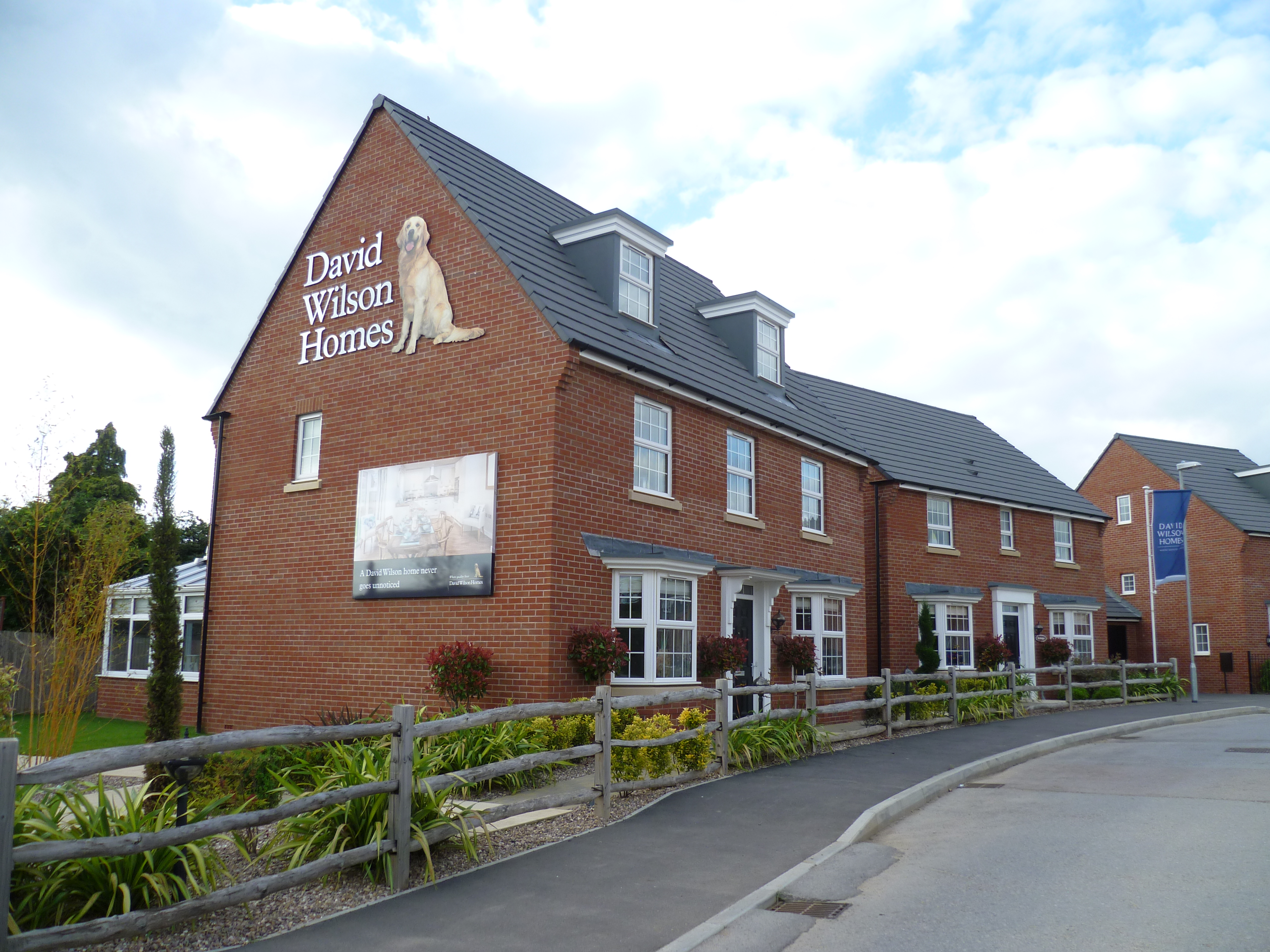
A David Wilson Homes branded house of Barratt Developments near Longford, Gloucestershire

Barratt Redrow plc is a British residential property development operating across England, Wales and Scotland. It is a constituent of the FTSE 100 Index. It was originally based in Newcastle upon Tyne, England, but is presently located at David Wilson's former offices in Coalville, England.

Barratt was originally founded in 1958 by Lewis Greensitt and Sir Lawrie Barratt as Greensitt Bros. to build houses. During 1968, the company, which had by then been renamed Greensitt & Barratt, was floated on the London Stock Exchange. Following Lewis Greensitt's departure, the company was rebranded as Barratt Developments. It grew rapidly during the 1970s, largely due to a spree of acquisitions. By June 1983, Barratt was the largest housebuilder in the country, selling a record 16,500 houses over the prior 12 months. Sales more than halved during the mid-1980s, a trend that was partly attributed to public criticism of Barratt's practices in two successive ITV World in Action programmes. In response, Barratt was heavily restructured, abandoned timber-framed construction in favour of a new product range, and de-emphasised its starter homes activities.

While Barratt Developments has almost exclusively focused on the British market, the overseas subsidiary Barratt American was established in the 1980s; it was eventually sold on via a management buyout in 2004. Barratt Developments was heavily impacted by the early 1990s recession, compelling Lawrie Barratt to return to active management and house production to be increased. During 2007, Barratt made its first acquisition in almost 30 years, purchasing Wilson Bowden for £2.7 billion, which enabled Barratt to become the biggest homebuilder in Britain once again. Amid the economic effects of the Great Recession, the firm had to write-off nearly £600 million along with 700 job losses and restructure its finances. During 2012, Barratt Residential Asset Management was established to provide property management services on a non-profit basis across Barratt London developments; it was acquired by FirstPort seven years later. On 7 February 2024, the company made an agreed offer to acquire rival homebuilder Redrow for £2.5 billion; the deal was concluded in October 2024, when the firm became known as Barratt Redrow.

== History ==
In 1953, Lawrie Barratt, an accountant who was frustrated at the high purchase prices of houses for first-time buyers, bought five acres of land at Darras Hall, near Newcastle upon Tyne and built his own home on the site. Following this experience, he joined forces with Lewis Greensitt, a Newcastle builder, to establish a house building business, which was initially known as Greensitt Brothers, in 1958.

During 1968, the company was floated on the London Stock Exchange as Greensitt & Barratt, by which time the company was building 500 homes per year and the growth plan had been "fully achieved". Lewis Greensitt left shortly after the flotation and in 1973 the company was renamed Barratt Developments. Throughout the 1970s, Barratt completed a series of acquisitions, transforming the company from a local housebuilder to a national firm building around 10,000 houses per year, and rivalling George Wimpey in size. The largest of these acquisitions were the Manchester-based firm Arthur Wardle and the Luton-based Janes.

Central to Barratt's expansion was its high-profile marketing, with national advertising, featuring Patrick Allen and a helicopter. Barratt provided starter homes for the first-time buyer and offered part-exchange to those trading up. In the year to June 1983, Barratt sold a record 16,500 houses, making it by far the largest housebuilder in the country. In 1983 and 1984, Barratt was subject to two successive ITV World in Action programmes, the first criticising timber-framed housing and the latter, starter homes. Within two years, unit sales had more than halved. Lawrie Barratt led a total restructuring of the company, abandoning timber-framed construction, launching a new product range, and concentrating on the more profitable trade-up market. In the late 1980s, Margaret Thatcher famously purchased a house on one of Barratt's most upmarket estates, in Dulwich, London.

During the 1980s, the company established the Californian-based business Barratt American, which expanded outside of the state after positive performance during the early 1990s. In 2004, the company sold Barratt American via a management buyout in exchange for £91 million; at the time, it was Barratt's only overseas unit and management opted to focus on the UK market instead.

The company was heavily impacted by the early 1990s recession. Barratt's fiscal circumstances led to Lawrie Barratt being recalled from retirement. The company promptly reoriented towards first time buyers and increased production. Lawrie retired for good in 1997 and remained life president of the firm until his death in December 2012.

There was a lengthy housing boom in the late 1990s and early 2000s, which saw a number of Barratt's largest rivals, such as Persimmon, George Wimpey and Taylor Woodrow all acquire rivals to increase in size. Likewise, in 2007, Barratt broke its tradition of 30 years and acquired Wilson Bowden, best known for its David Wilson Homes brand, in exchange for £2.7 billion; the move made Barratt the biggest homebuilder in Britain, employing roughly 7,500 people at the time of the acquisition. thus bringing the David Wilson, Ward Homes and Wilson Bowden Developments brands to the group; Barratt decided to retain the Wilson Bowden name for some activities.

In August 2008, amid the economic effects of the Great Recession and reports that Barratt was in jeopardy of breaking its banking covenants, the firm successfully restructured its arrangements. During early 2009, it reported a write-off of nearly £600 million along with 700 job losses. In November 2019, Barrett announced that it had completed its refinancing and was actively seeking to open new sites once again.

During the early 2010s, the firm entered into numerous partnerships with other companies. During 2012, the Barratt Residential Asset Management division was established to provide property management services on a non-profit basis across Barratt London developments. In March 2019, it was announced that Barratt Residential Asset Management had been acquired by FirstPort; as a result of the deal, the 11,000 Barratt London homes that it managed were transferred over to FirstPort.

In late 2017, Barratt withdrew from a development deal with Enfield Council valued at £6 billion after the local authority had dismissed its terms. During June 2019, Barratt acquired Oregon Timber Frame, one of the UK's largest timber frame manufacturers and a key supplier to Barratt.

Logo of Barratt Developments, prior to 2024 merger with Redrow.

During 2020, Barratt Developments set science-based carbon reduction targets as well as making a commitment to build zero carbon homes from 2030 and become a net zero business by 2040. Examples of sustainable developments include the Energy House 2.0, Green House at the BRE Innovation Park, Hanham Hall near Bristol, Derwenthorpe, near York and Kingsbrook, near Aylesbury. Another goal of the firm's emphasis on the adoption of modern methods of construction was to reduce the need for skilled labour.

As of 2024, Barratt Developments had achieved a 5 star rating in the Home Builders Federation new home Customer Satisfaction Survey for 15 consecutive years. In the 2024 NHBC Pride in the Job awards for site managers, Barratt site managers won 89 Quality Awards.

=== Barratt Redrow ===
On 7 February 2024, the company made an agreed offer to acquire Redrow for £2.5 billion. On the same date, both firms had confirmed reduced revenue and profit. The merged businesses would create a house builder, Barratt Redrow, turning over £7.45 billion and delivering over 22,600 homes a year. Subject to regulatory and shareholder approval, the deal was expected to be completed in the second quarter of 2024. The deal would see around 800 jobs lost and nine offices close. In March 2024, the Competition and Markets Authority (CMA) opened an investigation into the proposed acquisition, assessing if it might "result in a substantial lessening of competition within any market or markets in the United Kingdom for goods or services." In May 2024, the proposed merger was approved by shareholders, but the deal remained subject to CMA clearance. In August 2024, the CMA said the proposed deal raised competition concerns only in one specific part of the country: north Shropshire. Barratt and Redrow could make submissions to address the CMA's concerns about that area, to avoid the deal being subject to an in-depth phase two review. On 22 August 2024, Barratt officially took ownership of Redrow shares, but both firms would continue to operate independently until granting of final CMA approval. On 7 October 2024, after the CMA investigation was closed, the company became Barratt Redrow plc.

Also in February 2024, Barratt and Redrow were among eight UK housebuilders targeted by the CMA in an investigation into suspected breaches of competition law. The CMA said it had evidence that firms shared commercially sensitive information with competitors, influencing the build-out of sites and the prices of new homes. In January 2025, the CMA said it was conducting further investigations into suspected anti-competitive conduct by house-builders; after Barratt acquired Redrow, the number of companies under investigation reduced from eight to seven. In June 2025, the CMA investigation was extended to August 2025. In July 2025, the housebuilders offered to pay £100 million towards affordable housing programmes as part of an agreement to reform practices on information sharing and end the investigation without admitting any liability or wrongdoing. On 30 October 2025, the CMA confirmed its investigation had been dropped in return for a £100m payment towards affordable homes and other measures including the development of industry-wide guidance on information sharing and agreements not to share certain types of information with other housebuilders.

In September 2024, prior to final CMA authorisation of Barratt's Redrow acquisition, Barratt was overtaken by Vistry as Britain's biggest housebuilder, after it forecast it would deliver more than 18,000 homes (later revised downwards to 17,500), surpassing Barratt's 14,000. In April 2025, it was announced that Redrow CEO Matthew Pratt would step down in June 2025; Barratt Redrow said five of nine planned divisional office closures had been completed following the merger. The company aimed to eventually operate 32 UK divisions and complete 22,000 homes a year.

In the year to 29 June 2025, Barratt Redrow reported a pre-tax profit of £273.7m on revenue of £5.6bn. It said it was on track to make post-merger cost savings of £100m, with six divisional offices now closed and three to close, as it created 32 UK divisions.

In December 2025, the company announced its chief financial officer, Mike Scott, had resigned from the company. In March 2026, Barratt Redrow appointed Dean Banks as its next CEO; Banks will join the group from Australian infrastructure specialist Ventia in late 2026.

In a July 2026 trading update, Barratt Redrow announced the completion of 17,667 homes in its 2026 financial year, said profits before tax were in line with expectations, and proposed to return £400m to shareholders through a share buyback programme. In September 2026, Barratt Redrow reported revenues of £6.05bn and a statutory pre-tax profit of £364m. It also announced an additional provision of £97m relating to legacy building defects.

In November 2026, Barratt Redrow was revealed to be lagging behind other developers in remediating fire safety defects. It had started or completed work on just 28% of 541 buildings requiring fire safety works.

== Operations ==
=== UK house building ===
Barratt Redrow plc owns four consumer brands: Barratt Homes, Barratt London, David Wilson Homes and Redrow.

=== Commercial construction ===
Barratt owns and operates Wilson Bowden Developments, which develops commercial property in the UK.

Among projects led by Wilson Bowden Developments is Optimus Point, a 74-acre greenfield site at Glenfield, Leicestershire.

Barratt Redrow also owns Oregon Timber Frame, a timber frame manufacturing company with factories in Selkirk and Derby.

== Criticisms ==
In 2017, the Daily Telegraph noted "10 purported crashes in just 48 hours" on what they regard as arguably "Britain’s most dangerous roundabout." Derbyshire County Council removed wrecked vehicles from the roundabout at Mickleover which drivers said was poorly lit and badly signed. The council said that Barratts were responsible for the design though it had been checked by their engineers.

In 2019, the CMA launched an investigation into alleged mis-selling of homes on a leasehold basis, with Barratt one of four housebuilders targeted in September 2020. In August 2022, after "careful scrutiny of the evidence gathered", and an assessment that a successful legal case was unlikely, the CMA closed its three-year investigation citing lack of evidence, while noting "Barratt’s sales practices have changed, and they no longer sell leasehold houses."

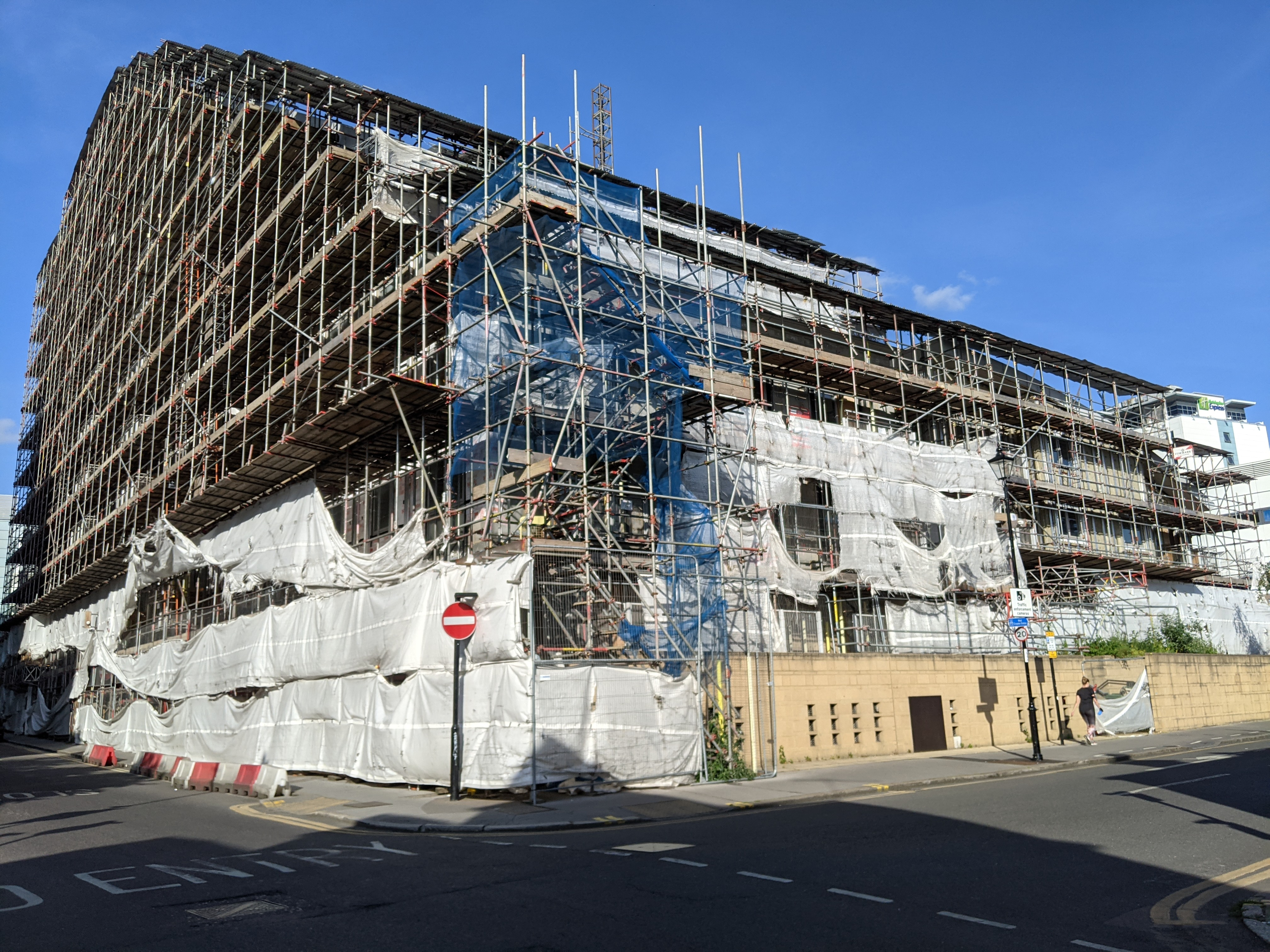
The Citiscape building in Croydon clad in scaffolding due to the removal of flammable cladding and defects found in the reinforced concrete frame

In 2020, during remedial work to replace flammable cladding at the Citiscape high-rise in Croydon, defects were found in the reinforced concrete frame of the building. A further review found similar defects in seven other developments. Remediation was set to cost £70m in 2020, but had increased a year later to £163m. Citiscape residents were rehoused in September 2019, and in May 2021, Barratt reacquired the 95 flats at Citiscape from their leaseholders and was in the process of reacquiring the freehold from a Vincent Tchenguiz controlled company. In addition to remediation work at Citiscape, Barratt later (July 2024) identified two further London developments requiring £130 million in further work to resolve concrete frame issues. A year later, in July 2025, Barratt Redrow revealed a further £248m charge relating to legacy building safety defects across several developments. In September 2025, the group's total bill to fix building safety defects was £1,073.8m, a figure which was virtually unchanged a year later.

On 27 July 2021, an article by The Times Environment Correspondent, Ben Webster, highlighted issues over the approach to biodiversity reporting taken by Barratt subsidiary, David Wilson Homes. in relation to a green field development in the Buckinghamshire village of Maids Moreton.

In September 2023, Barratt submitted plans to demolish 83 new homes on its Darwin Green estate in Cambridge which had been built with faulty foundations.

In October 2023, The Comet newspaper carried a report of David Wilson Homes representative Martin Wright being "told off for making threats" at a planning meeting related to the Highover Farm development in Hitchin. Planning Committee member, Councillor Daniel Allen commented "Threatening us is not a great way to make friends during a statement" after Mr Wright advised a Planning Inspector could "strike out" some of the developer contributions.

In July 2024, The Guardian reported a home in Ivybridge, Devon, built by Barratt subsidiary David Wilson Homes and sold for £274,995, had been independently valued in 2023 at £1 due to a catalogue of major defects. Owners of other houses on the same Ivybridge estate had also reported problems, and were engaged in legal action seeking redress from Barratt.

On 27 May 2025 the BBC reported that the local water recycling centre in Buckingham did not have capacity to support a proposed housing development in Maids Moreton, Buckinghamshire.
