= Carrington Moss =

Area of peat bog in Greater Manchester, England

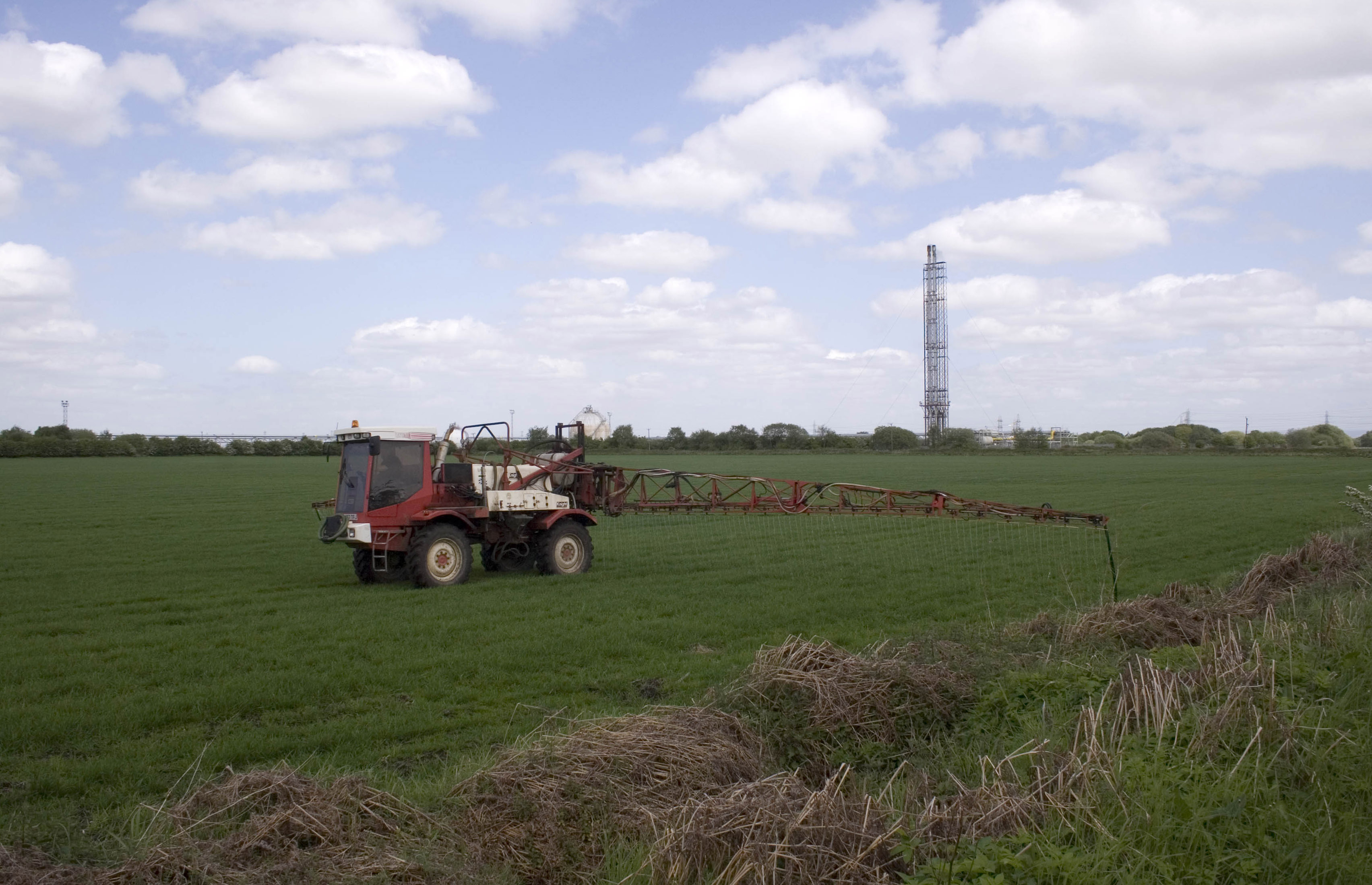
- Farming at Carrington Moss

- Location within Greater Manchester
- OS grid reference: SJ746918
- Metropolitan borough: Trafford
- Metropolitan county: Greater Manchester
- Region: North West
- Country: England
- Sovereign state: United Kingdom
- Police: Greater Manchester
- Fire: Greater Manchester
- Ambulance: North West

Carrington Moss is a large area of peat bog near Carrington, Greater Manchester, England, south of the River Mersey, 10 miles (16 km) south-west of Manchester. It occupies an area of about 1,100 acres (450 ha). The depth of peat varies between 17 and 20 feet (5.2 and 6.1 m).

Originally an unused area of grouse moorland, the moss was reclaimed in the latter half of the 19th century for farming and the disposal of Manchester's waste. A system of tramways was built to connect it with the Manchester Ship Canal and a nearby railway line. In the Second World War, the land was used as a Starfish site and in the latter half of the 20th century a large industrial complex was built along its northern edge. More recently, several sporting facilities have been built on Carrington Moss.

The land is still used for farming and several nature reserves have been established within its bounds. Parts of Carrington Moss are accessible to the public over several rights of way.

== History ==
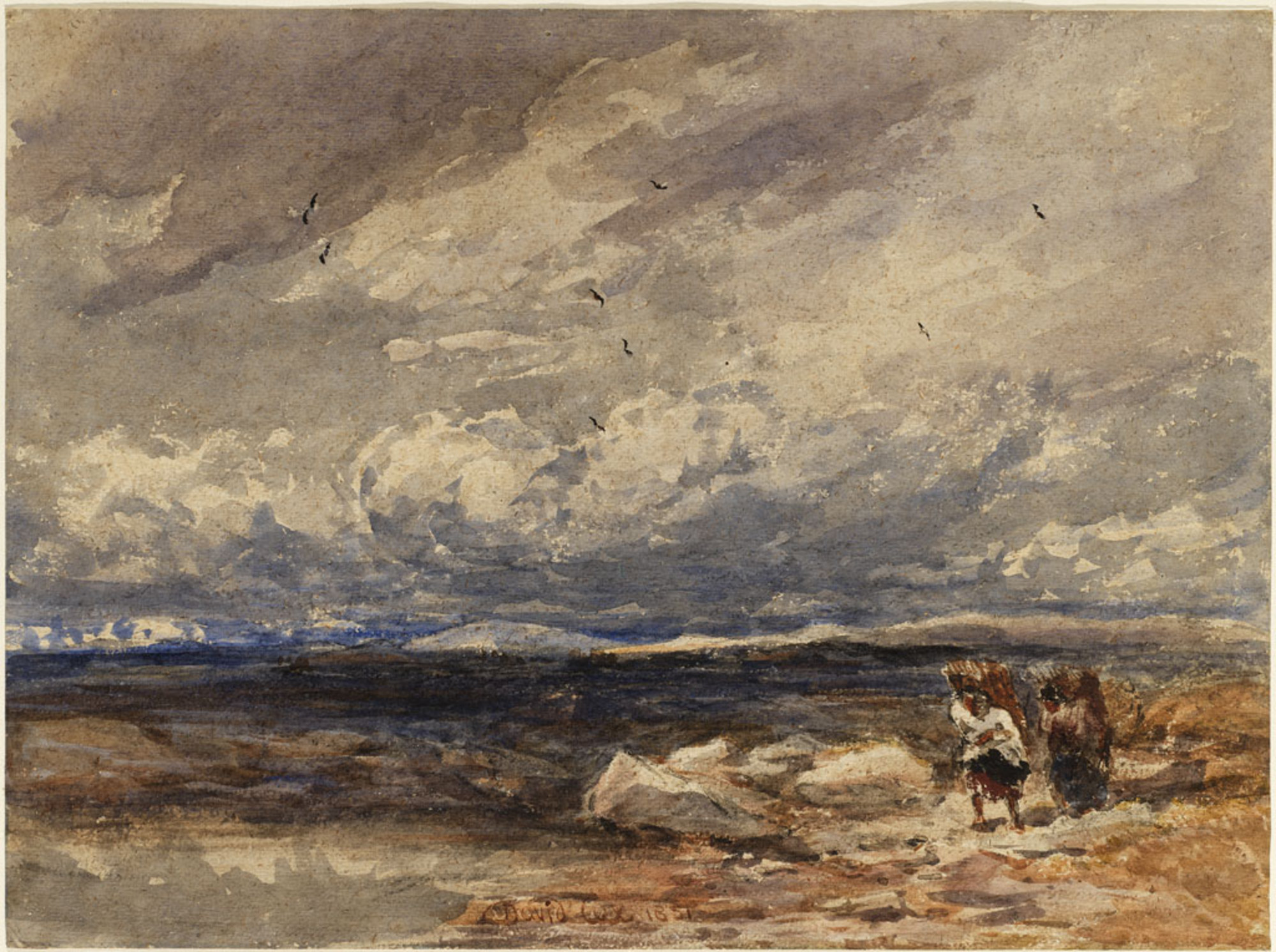
On Carrington Moss, 1851, David Cox

A History of Flixton, Urmston, and Davyhulme (1898) claims that the name Carrington might be derived from the Goidelic Celtic root Cathair, a fortress, but a more recent theory is that it derives from an Anglicised form of a Scandinavian personal name. A Carrington Hall, seat of the Carrington family (descended from William de Caryngton) once existed to the north of Carrington Moss, at the junction formed by the modern-day A6144 and B5158 roads. The word moss, first used during the 15th century, forms part of the local name for a lowland peat bog, "mosslands". Today the term is also used to describe former bogs that have been converted to farmland.

=== 19th century ===
Manchester's population increased by more than 150% between 1831 and 1851. This placed considerable pressure on the city's ability to dispose of refuse, exacerbated during the 1870s by a gradual switch from the older cesspit methods of sewage disposal to pail closets. These needed to be emptied regularly and by the 1880s, night soil accounted for about 75% of Manchester's 200,000 long tons (200,000 t; 220,000 short tons) of refuse.

Along with parts of Moss Side and Withington, in 1885 Bradford, Harpurhey and Rusholme became part of the City of Manchester. To cope with the extra demands placed on the area's refuse disposal systems, Manchester Corporation began to look for disposal sites. A number of locations were considered, including one on Deeside and another in Nottinghamshire, but Carrington Moss was chosen due to the nature of its land and its accessibility. Therefore, in 1886, the corporation bought the Carrington Moss Estate—an area of grouse moorland—from Harry Grey, 8th Earl of Stamford.

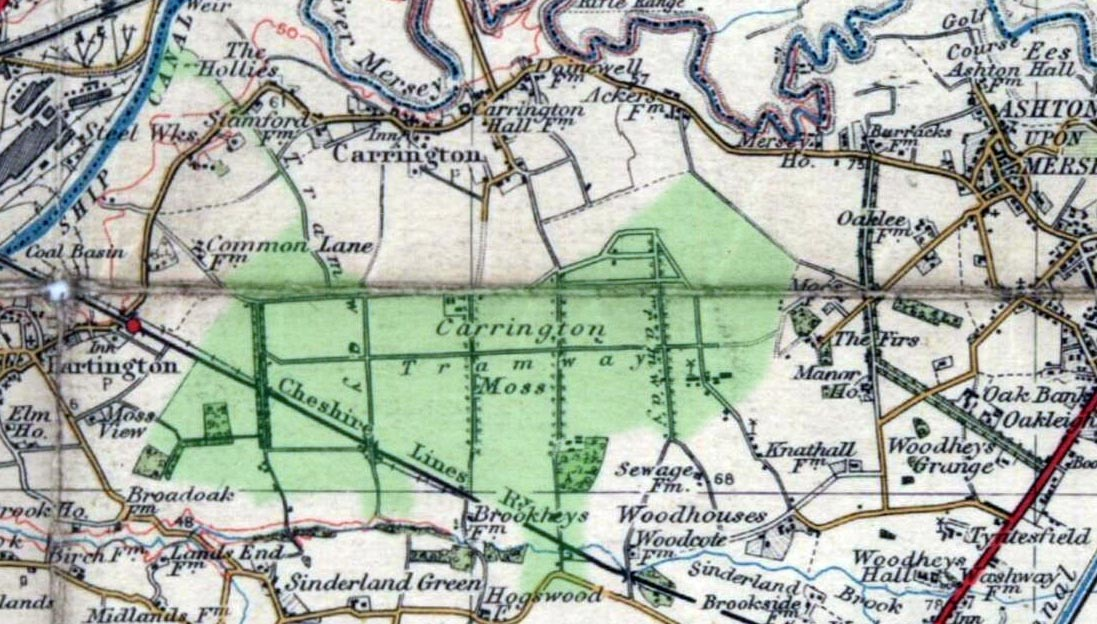
A 1937 map of Carrington Moss, with the boundary of the Carrington Moss Estate overlaid in green. The tramway network is clearly visible, including the connection to the Manchester Ship Canal.

The purchase was part of the corporation's ultimately unsuccessful plan to retain the pail closet system (now superseded by the water closet), and followed a public scandal created by the daily dumping of 30–60 tons of human faeces into the Medlock and Irwell rivers, at Holt Town sewage works. It paid about £38,000 (£4 million as of 2025), for the site, but the bog's depth, between 17 and 20 feet or 5.2 and 6.1 metres deep pushed the total development cost to almost £94,000 (£11 million as of 2025). The 1,101-acre (446 ha) estate included 600 acres (2.4 km^{2}) of wild mossland, 209 acres (0.85 km^{2}) of partly cultivated mossland, 282 acres (1.14 km^{2}) of mossland under cultivation and 10 acres (40,000 m^{2}) of incomplete roads. A number of brick buildings were included, along with Asphodel Farm and Ash Farm, both with wooden farmhouses. The corporation rented 700 acres (2.8 km^{2}) of land in small holdings to local farmers and kept 400 acres (1.6 km^{2}) for itself.

The bog's virgin moss was cultivated and drainage channels cut through at regular intervals, the first step in the area's reclamation. This drainage caused the characteristically convex Moss to sag noticeably; some residents of Dunham Town commented that they could see parts of Carrington previously obscured by the moss. A network of tramways and roads was constructed using clinker and other materials brought from the city. Drains were laid and the land cleared of scrub. A water supply was also installed. Some of the more dangerous buildings were demolished, while others were either repaired or replaced.

Refuse was loaded from a number of locations and was first transported along the Mersey and Irwell Navigation, until that waterway was closed on 11 November 1888. For several years until the completion of its replacement, the Manchester Ship Canal, the corporation was reliant on Manchester's local railway network. Refuse was loaded at the corporation's Water Street Depot on to Cornbrook sidings and in waggons to Carrington on a junction from the Cheshire Lines Committee's (CLC) Glazebrook to Stockport Tiviot Dale line. The canal company installed a temporary dock on the new canal, although this was considered impractical and was rarely used. A more permanent arrangement was made several years later. New railway sidings were also built; once complete, refuse was loaded from near Oldham Road railway station and the corporation's Water Street Depot. It was then transported along the Ship Canal to a newly built wharf, and thereafter, by tramway across the moss.

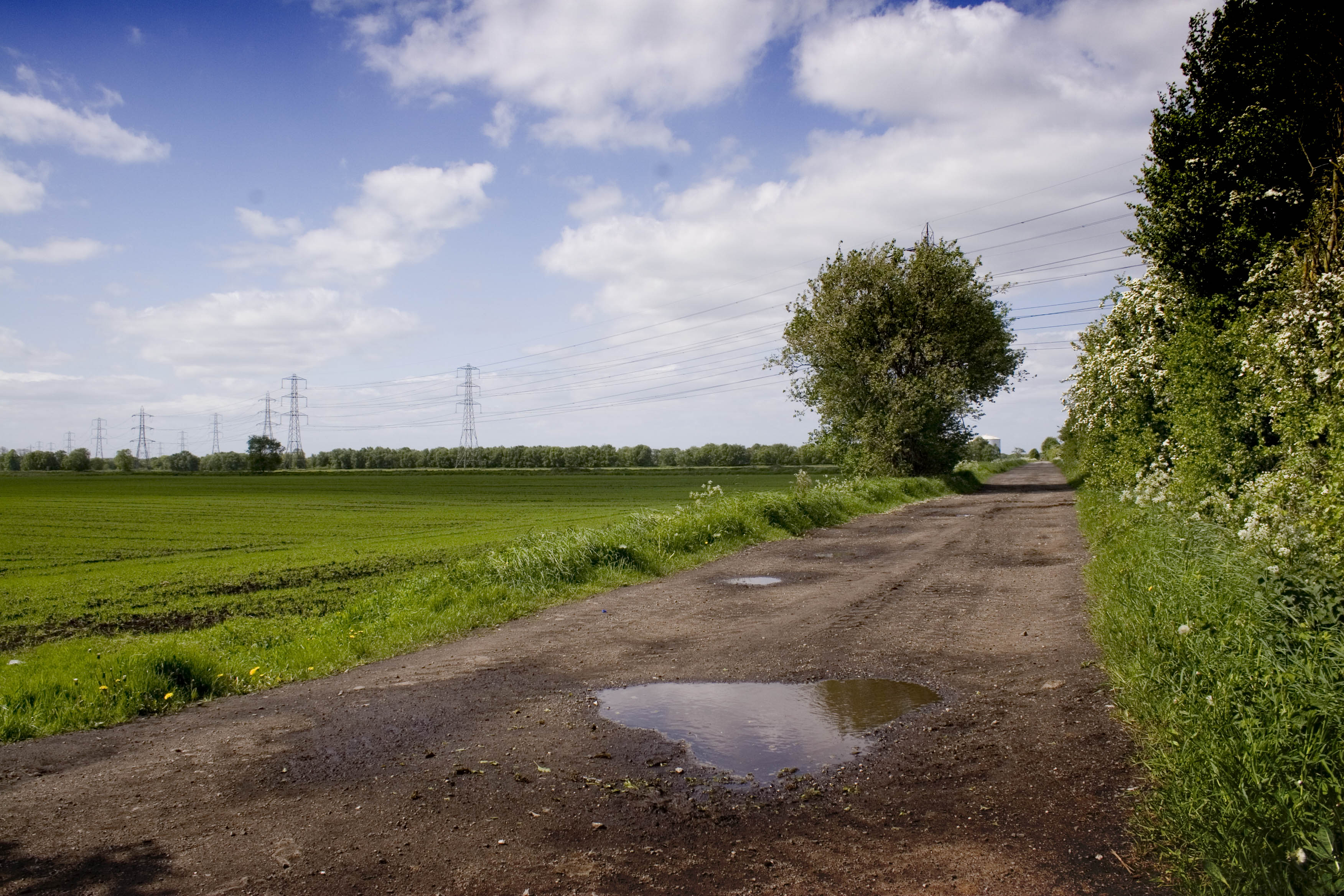
Ashton Road, a former tramway

Once delivered, refuse was normally placed in heaps and allowed to dry before being put into the ground. The naturally acidic water was a perfect receptacle for the contents of pail closets, rich in urea and nitrogen. Bacteria quickly broke the refuse down into ammonium compounds and free ammonia, which neutralised the soil's acidity and created ammonium nitrate—an essential fertiliser for arable land.

By the 1890s, over 70,000 long tons of excrement annually were being disposed of on the moss. The land was a useful source of income for Manchester; for the year ending 31 March 1900 the estate made a profit of £777 5s 2d (by comparison, the larger Chat Moss made £2,591 13s 4d). Its success helped persuade Manchester Corporation to purchase 2,583 acres of nearby Chat Moss in 1895. By 1897, 37,082 long tons of nightsoil, 587 long tons of sweepings and litter and 11,673 long tons of cinders were being sent to Carrington. Various crops were grown on the land, including wheat, oats, potatoes and carrots. A variety of ornamental shrubs, including rhododendrons, were grown in a nursery and used in the parks and gardens of Manchester.

=== 20th century ===
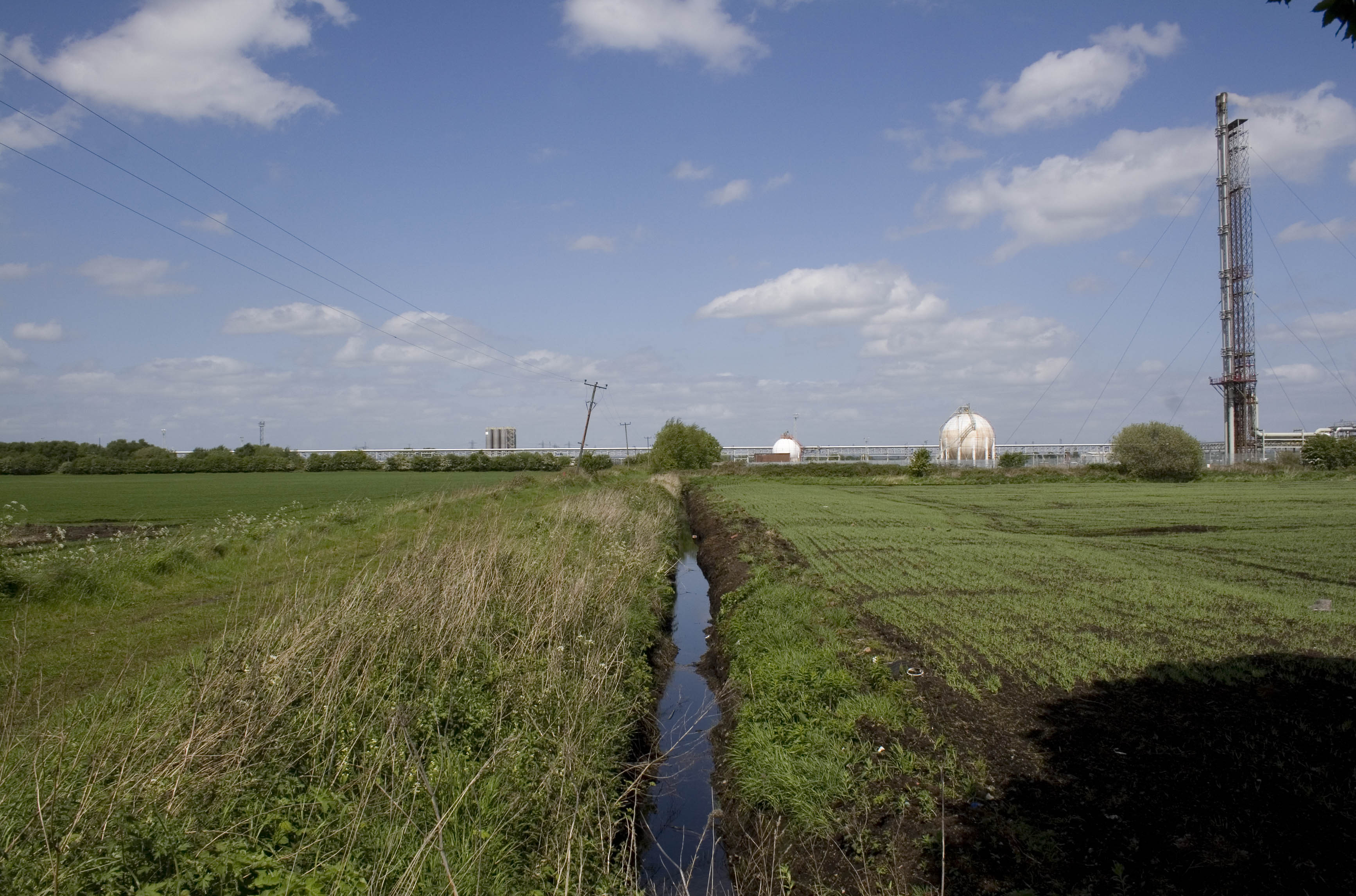
A drainage ditch at Carrington Moss. The Shell Chemicals plant is visible on the horizon.

By the 1930s, extensive use of the water closet meant that the amount of night soil being delivered to Carrington Moss had dropped significantly. During this period, the majority of refuse placed on the Moss came from ash bins, although some was from slaughterhouses and lairage facilities. In 1923, manure of only moderate value was being delivered, supplemented by sulphate of potash, sulphate of ammonia, and super-phosphates. Altrincham Sewage Farm (visible on the above map) was used to flood the surrounding fields with sewage water. To the west, a series of disused marl-pits formed Timperley Sewage Beds, a further source of manure.

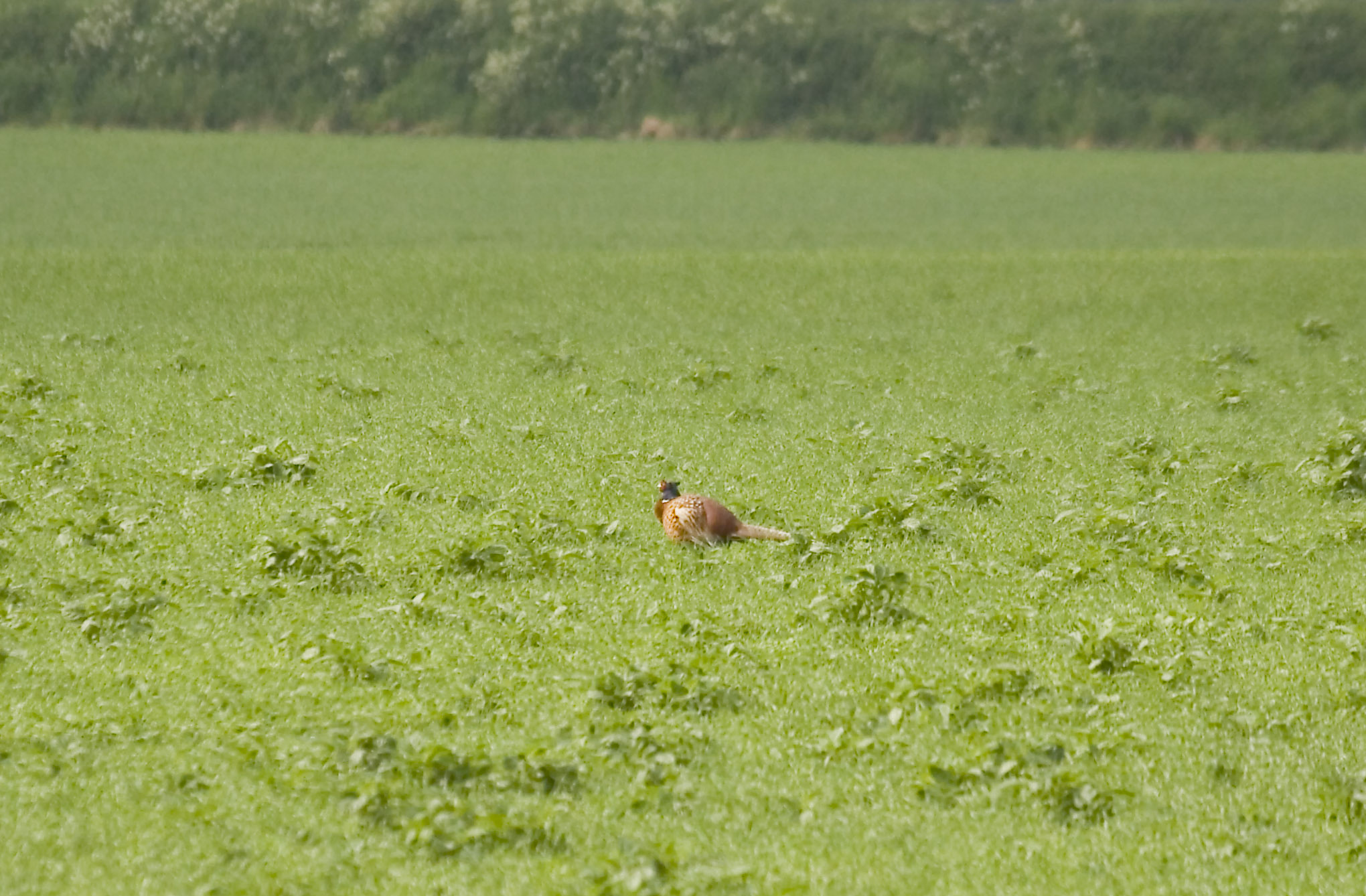
A common pheasant at Carrington Moss

Carrington Wharf had fallen out of use by 1934 and with the advent of the Second World War, five miles (8 km) of railway were lifted and all the waggons scrapped. At the Ministry of Supply's request, much of the infrastructure supporting both Carrington Moss and Chat Moss was sold. The sidings at Carrington continued to be used by the CLC for waggon storage, but Carrington Wharf was subsumed in 1946 by the construction of Carrington Power Station. During the war, the moss became one of four sites in Manchester used as a Starfish site—decoy targets for enemy aircraft. Operational control was the responsibility of RAF Balloon Command. The site contained an air raid shelter for the operational crew and several combustible devices used to simulate fires and lights. The site was activated in December 1940 but closed several years later, following a reduction in enemy aircraft attacks and lack of manpower.

In 1948, the estate was valued at £82,615. In the year ending March 1971, it produced an income of £20,268. By that time the entire Moss had been fully reclaimed; 872.785 acres (3.53204 km^{2}) of cultivated land, 39.012 acres (157,880 m^{2}) of roads and plantations, and 30.140 acres (121,970 m^{2}) of 'industrial area' were available for use. The principal land uses were dairy, arable farming, and glasshouse culture. No refuse was delivered for the year ending March 1971, and the Moss had by that time taken a total of 1,305,822 tons of refuse.

Industrialisation of the moss took place from 1947–1952 when Petro-Carbon ltd began to build what would later become known as the Shell Site. The estate was leased on 1 October 1968 to Shell Chemicals, who in 1957 had purchased a propylene oxide plant along the moss's northern edge. Shell had built an ethylene oxide plant in 1958 and began to produce polyether polyols the following year. Council housing was built nearby, at Carrington and Partington, for workers and their families. By 1985 the Shell plant had a turnover of about £200M and employed 1,150 people, but a major restructuring of the business reduced the workforce to less than 500 by 1986. By 1994, four distinct plants operated on the 3,500-acre (14 km^{2}) site, producing a range of chemicals, and materials including polystyrene, polyethylene and polypropylene. In 2005 it was reported that Shell would close their polyols and ethoxylates units, a decision which came into effect in 2007. The estate is currently managed by chartered surveyors Bell Ingram. LyondellBasell operate the last remaining chemical plant on site.

Manchester United opened their Trafford Training Centre training ground and Academy in 2000, on land formerly owned by Shell. Bury F.C.'s Carrington Training Centre, formerly occupied by Manchester City F.C., is located nearby. Because of the Moss's history as a dumping ground for waste, bottle diggers often frequent the area. Several rights of way exist on the land, and a horse-riding school operates in the area.

== Geography and ecology ==
"Birdsong on Birch Road"
A lapwing and a common chaffinch at Carrington Moss

"Birch Moss Covert"
Blackbirds in the distance, accompanied by a wren and a willow warbler

"Birch Moss Covert"
A wren, and singing distantly a European robin

At 53°25′14″N 2°23′16″W (53.42056, 2.38778), 65.6 feet (20.0 m) above sea level, Carrington Moss lies along the southern edge of the Lancashire Plain, an area of Bunter sandstones overlaid with marls laid down during the Late Triassic period. These rocks are themselves overlaid by a layer of boulder clay deposited during the last ice age, about 10,000 years ago. The combination of the flat topography and the underlying clay resulted in extensive peat bogs developing along the Mersey Valley, and overflowing beyond the valley. Along with large parts of Chat Moss and Holcroft Moss, Carrington Moss began to form during the Flandrian period from 7100 to 5000 BP.

=== Flora and fauna ===
Carrington Moss is a lowland raised bog. The area drains slowly, which slows the decomposition of plant life and leads to the accumulation of peat. Over thousands of years this raises the level of peat and forms a gently sloping dome (hence, raised). Such areas support a wide range of flora and fauna; Sphagnum balticum, a medium-sized bog moss, was recorded on Carrington Moss in the 1880s, although locally it is now presumed to be extinct. Bog asphodel (Narthecium ossifragum), white beak-sedge (Rhynchospora alba), cranberries, bog-rosemary (Andromeda polifolia), and the cotton sedge have also been recorded. In 1923 species of trees recorded by E. Price Evans for the Journal of Ecology included English oak (Quercus robur), and common ash (Fraxinus excelsior). Undergrowth included common hazel (Corylus avellana), blackberry (Rubus fruticosus), and European holly (Ilex aquifolium). Several species of ground vegetation included creeping soft grass (Holcus mollis), common bluebell (Hyacinthoides non-scripta), common foxglove (Digitalis purpurea), dog's mercury (Mercurialis perennis), iris (Iris pseudacorus), mad-dog weed (Alisma plantago-aquatica), and cat-o'-nine-tails (Typha latifolia).

Birch Moss Covert is a small woodland containing birch, alder and willow trees, as well as various species of flora and fauna. The small mammal population includes the wood mouse, which attract both kestrel and sparrowhawk. Red foxes, stoats, weasels, and badgers, are often seen. The area is part of Shell's estate, covering about 15 acres (61,000 m^{2}) of land managed by the Cheshire Wildlife Trust. The trust also manages a small nature reserve located within Manchester United's training ground. This provides a habitat for a number of species including the red admiral, meadow pipit, and grey partridge. Carrington Moss is home to the only recorded pairs of breeding grey partridge in Trafford. Six pairs of Eurasian bullfinch were recorded in 2003. The reduction in the population of these and similar birds is attributed to modern farming methods, the loss of broad hedgerows, and the lack of winter stubble. Action for Nature in Trafford has therefore included the site in its Biodiversity Action Plan. The group intends to develop Carrington Moss as a home for other species, such as reed bunting. Stigmella continuella (a species of moth occurring in southern and north-west England) has been observed in the area.
