= Carrington Training Centre =

Football training ground in England

- Carrington
- Interactive map of Carrington Training Centre
- Location: Carrington Moss, Carrington, Greater Manchester
- Coordinates: 53°25′52″N 02°22′19″W
- Owner: Manchester City
- Operator: Sale Sharks
- Type: Sports facility

Construction
- Built: 2000
- Opened: 2001

Tenants
- Manchester City (2001–2014); Bury (2015–2019); Sale Sharks (2020–present)

Carrington Training Centre, sometimes referred to as Carrington, was the training ground of EFL League Two club Bury, leased from Manchester City. The League Two club moved into this complex in early 2015 when previous holders Manchester City moved into a new £50 million training facility close to its Sportcity home in east Manchester. In 2020, Sale Sharks Rugby Union Team became the new tenants of the ground, moving from their previous facility also based in Carrington.

== Location and facilities ==
The training ground is situated away from the City of Manchester in Trafford, like that of Manchester United who also have a training ground nearby (Trafford Training Centre). The training ground is adjacent to a public footpath, allowing members of the public and photographers to watch training sessions freely in the past. In recent years, a six-foot tarpaulin curtain surrounds the training ground, with photographers and members of the public resorting to step ladders and perching themselves on trees to watch training sessions. City have attempted to seek planning permission from Trafford Metropolitan Borough Council to increase the height of the barrier from six feet, the maximum height permitted without planning permission.

The 60,000sq metre training complex has been refurbished and has a gym, a hydro-therapy pool, medical facilities, and a match analysis suite.

== New training complex ==
Manchester City vacated Carrington to move to Sportcity near the Etihad Stadium. This move was completed in 2014 after planning permission was granted in March 2010, Manchester City and Manchester City Council agreed to redevelop land around Sportcity and the club bought 59 acres (240,000 m^{2}) of land nearby in Openshaw West. The new training ground will cost about £50m and is part of a £1 billion redevelopment around Eastlands that will be led by architect Rafael Vinoly.
