= Carrington, Greater Manchester =

Village and civil parish in England

Coordinates: 53.431°N 2.392°W

Carrington
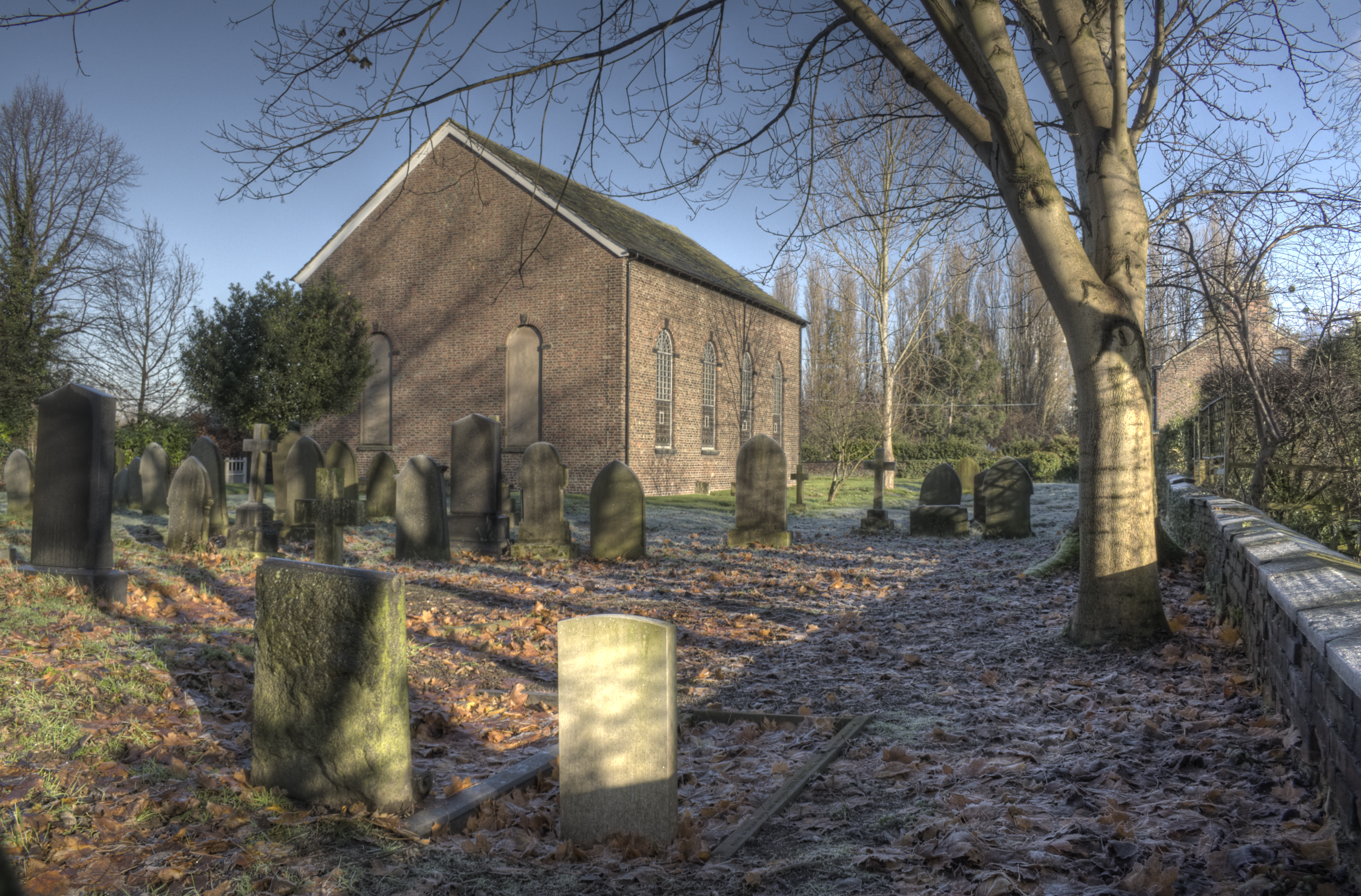
- St George's Church, a Grade II* listed building

- Location within Greater Manchester
- Population: 481 (2021 Census)
- OS grid reference: SJ737921
- Civil parish: Carrington
- Metropolitan borough: Trafford
- Metropolitan county: Greater Manchester
- Region: North West
- Country: England
- Sovereign state: United Kingdom
- Post town: MANCHESTER
- Postcode district: M31
- Dialling code: 0161
- Police: Greater Manchester
- Fire: Greater Manchester
- Ambulance: North West
- UK Parliament: Stretford and Urmston

Carrington is a village and civil parish in the Metropolitan Borough of Trafford, Greater Manchester, England. Historically a part of Cheshire, the village is west of the Greater Manchester Urban Area, and includes several industrial sites.

== History ==
Several derivations of the name Carrington have been suggested, all from Old English. The name may mean "estate associated with a man called Cara"; alternatively, the first part of the name may be derived from caring, meaning "tending or herding" or cring, which means "river bend", so either "place associated with herding", or "settlement by a river bend". In the 12th century, Carrington was known as Carrintona.

== Industry ==
Carrington has a large gas and chemical works, which produce gases by fractional distillation of liquid air. It used to be the site of a Shell Chemicals refinery, which produced polythene and polystyrene.

Carrington Power Station was on the south bank of the Manchester Ship Canal. Building work commenced in 1947, although land for the site was acquired in 1916. It opened in 1956, was decommissioned in the late 1980s, and demolished using explosives in 1991, having stood empty for several years. All that remains today is a large 400 kV switching station. The station had its own railway spur from the Glazebrook to Stockport Tiviot Dale line, evidence of which can still be seen today from the gates where the line crossed Manchester Road.

In 2007, Bridestones Developments acquired planning permission for a new CCGT (Combined Cycle Gas Turbine) power station, to be built on the same site as the old power station. Construction of the new power station began in 2013 and was completed in the Autumn of 2016. The new power station will generate three times the energy as the old coal-fired power station, will occupy only half of the space of the old site and will emit only half of the carbon dioxide. Around 600 people have been involved in its construction, and, when it is finally inoperation, there will be around 40 staff employed at the power station. The new power station will generate up to 880 MW of electricity, which is enough to supply approximately one million homes. Some of the parts for the new plant were so large that they were transported to the site via the Manchester Ship Canal

== Future ==
The "New Carrington" site, including the former Shell site, has been allocated for development in the Greater Manchester Spatial Framework. The site could provide 11,500 dwellings and 750,000 sqm employment floorspace.

== Sport ==
Manchester United have the Trafford Training Centre and Bury formerly had the Carrington Training Centre on Carrington Moss, as does Sale Sharks Rugby Club.

== Demography ==
At the 2021 UK census, Carrington had a total population of 481. For every 242 females, there were 238 males. The average household size was 2.62. Of those aged 16–74 in Carrington, 53.3% had no academic qualifications or one GCSE, higher than the figures for all of Trafford (40.8%) and in England (45.5%). According to the census, 1.75% were unemployed and 34.39% were economically inactive. 21.72% of the population were under the age of 16 and 6.31% were aged 75 and over; the mean age of the people of Carrington was 37.24. 66.41% of residents described their health as "good".

=== Population change ===
Population change in Carrington since 1801
Year	1801	1811	1821	1831	1841	1851	1861	1871	1881	1891	1901	1911	1921	1931	1951	1961	1971	2001	2021	
Population	435	480	531	552	559	536	521	469	438	568	514	522	531	504	627	642	488	396	481	Source: A Vision of Britain through Time

== See also ==
- Listed buildings in Carrington, Greater Manchester
