= List of structural engineers =

This is a list of notable structural engineers, people who were trained in or practiced structural engineering and who are notable enough for a Wikipedia article.

See also architect and lists of engineers.

== A ==
- Ove Arup

== B ==
- John Baker
- William F. Baker
- Cecil Balmond
- Hannskarl Bandel
- Isambard Kingdom Brunel
- Sarah Buck

== C ==
- Santiago Calatrava
- Felix Candela
- Anil K. Chopra
- Jamilur Reza Choudhury
- Ray William Clough
- Joseph Colaco
- Hardy Cross
- Carl Culmann

== D ==
- Fabrizio de Miranda
- Henry J. Degenkolb
- John Anthony Derrington
- J. Augustine DeSazilly
- Michael Dickson
- Eladio Dieste
- Patrick Dowling
- Peter Thomas Dunican
- H. Kempton Dyson

== E ==
- Gustave Eiffel
- J. R. Eyerman

== F ==
- Oscar Faber
- William Fairbairn
- Hilario Fernández Long
- Eugene Figg
- Nicholas Forell
- Eugene Freyssinet

== G ==
- Richard H. Gallagher
- William George Nicholson Geddes
- William Glanville
- Mike Glover

== H ==
- Edmund Happold - founder of Buro Happold
- François Hennebique
- Charles Hershfield - co-founder of Morrison Hershfield
- Eaton Hodgkinson
- Michael Horne
- John Howell & Son
- Anthony Hunt
- Charles Husband

== I ==
- Heinz Isler

== K ==
- Oleg Kerensky
- Fazlur Rahman Khan
- Maurice Koechlin
- Baruch Katinka

== L ==
- William LeMessurier - founder of LeMessurier Consultants
- Fritz Leonhardt
- Li Guohao
- Ian Liddell
- Tung-Yen Lin

== M ==
- Robert Maillart
- Mao Yisheng
- Guy Maunsell
- Christian Menn
- Riccardo Morandi
- Carson Morrison - co-founder of Morrison Hershfield

== N ==
- Pier Luigi Nervi
- David Nethercot
- Frank Newby
- Nathan M. Newmark

== O ==
- Frei Otto

== P ==
- Egor Popov
- Alfred Pugsley
- Nigel Priestley

== R ==
- Eric Reissner
- Peter Rice
- Leslie E. Robertson

== S ==
- Kolbjørn Saether
- Jörg Schlaich
- Marc Seguin
- Mark Serrurier
- Fred Severud
- Vladimir Shukhov
- Juan C. Simo
- Alec Skempton
- John Skilling
- Frederick Snow
- Werner Sobek
- Josef Stenbäck
- Robert Stephenson
- Joseph Strauss

== T ==
- Man-Chung Tang
- Margot Taule
- Stephen Timoshenko
- Eduardo Torroja
- C.A.P. Turner

== V ==
- Arthur Vierendeel
- Michel Virlogeux

== W ==
- John Waddell
- Faith Wainwright
- Arnold Waters
- André Waterkeyn
- Paul Westbury
- Chris Wise

== Y ==
- Henry T. Yang
- Nabih Youssef

== Z ==
- Olgierd Zienkiewicz
- Jack Zunz
