= Gold Medal of the Institution of Structural Engineers =

Award for exceptional and outstanding contributions to structural engineering

Gold Medal
- Awarded for: Exceptional and outstanding contributions to the advancement of structural engineering
- Sponsored by: Institution of Structural Engineers
- Date: 1922
- Country: United Kingdom
- Website: Official website

The Gold Medal of the Institution of Structural Engineers is awarded by the Institution of Structural Engineers for exceptional and outstanding contributions to the advancement of structural engineering. It was established in 1922.

== Recipients ==
Year	Recipient(s)	Company
1922	(United Kingdom) Henry Adams	Henry Adams
1953	(United Kingdom) John Baker	University of Cambridge
1957	(France) Eugène Freyssinet	Campenon-Bernard
1958	(United States) Hardy Cross	Yale University
1959	not awarded	
1960	(Spain) Félix Candela	Félix Candela
1961	not awarded	
1962	(United Kingdom) William Glanville	Road Research Laboratory
1963	not awarded	
1964	(United Kingdom) John Guthrie Brown	Sir Alexander Gibb & Partners
1965	not awarded	
1966	not awarded	
1967	(Italy) Pier Luigi Nervi	University of Rome
1968	(United Kingdom) Sir Alfred Pugsley	University of Bristol
1969	not awarded	
1970	not awarded	
1971	(Denmark) Knud Winstrup Johansen	University of Michigan
1972	(France) Yves Guyon	Campenon-Bernard
1973	(United Kingdom) Sir Ove Arup	Arup Group
1973	(United Kingdom) Charles Husband	Husband & Co.
1974	not awarded	
1975	(Germany) Fritz Leonhardt	Leonhardt und Andrä
1976	not awarded	
1977	(Soviet Union) Oleg Kerensky	Freeman Fox & Partners
1978	not awarded	
1979	(United States) Nathan M. Newmark	University of Illinois
1980	(Italy) Riccardo Morandi	Riccardo Morandi
1981	(United Kingdom) Alec Skempton	Imperial College London
1982	not awarded	
1983	not awarded	
1984	(United Kingdom) Alan Harris	Harris and Sutherland
1985	(United Kingdom) Frank Newby	F J Samuely & Partners
1986	(United Kingdom) Michael Horne	University of Manchester
1987	(Canada) Alan Garnett Davenport	University of Western Ontario
1988	(United Kingdom) Anthony Flint	Flint & Neill Partnership
1988	(United Kingdom) Sir Jack Zunz	Arup Group
1989	not awarded	
1990	(Germany) Jörg Schlaich	Schlaich Bergermann Partner
1991	(United Kingdom) Sir Edmund Happold	Buro Happold, Arup Group
1991	(Poland) Olgierd Zienkiewicz	Swansea University
1992	(Spain) Santiago Calatrava	Santiago Calatrava
1993	not awarded	
1994	(United Kingdom) Anthony Hunt	Anthony Hunt Associates
1995	not awarded	
1996	(France) Michel Virlogeux	French Highway Administration
1997	(United Kingdom) John Burland	Imperial College London
1998	(United Kingdom) Michael Burdekin	University of Manchester
1999	(United Kingdom) Ian Liddell	Buro Happold
2000	(United Kingdom) Sir Duncan Michael	Arup Group
2001	(Hong Kong) Cheng Hon-kwan	Executive Council of Hong Kong
2002	not awarded	
2003	(United Kingdom) Sam Thorburn OBE	Thorburn Colquhoun
2004	(United States) Leslie E. Robertson	Leslie E. Robertson Associates
2005	(United Kingdom) John Roberts	Jacobs Engineering Group
2006	(United Kingdom) Roger Johnson	Warwick University, Arup Group
2007	(United Kingdom) Joe Locke MBE	Watson Steel
2008	(United Kingdom) Mike Glover OBE	Arup Group
2009	(United Kingdom) David A. Nethercot	Imperial College London
2010	(United States) William F. Baker	Skidmore, Owings & Merrill
2011	(United Kingdom) Allan Mann	Jacobs Engineering Group
2012	(United Kingdom) Paul Westbury	Buro Happold
2012	(United Kingdom) Chris Wise	Expedition Engineering, Arup Group
2013	(China) Man-Chung Tang	T. Y. Lin International
2014	(United Kingdom) Tristram Carfrae	Arup Group
2015	(Germany) Mike Schlaich	Schlaich Bergermann Partner
2016	(United States) Robert Halvorson	Halvorson and Partners
2017	(United Kingdom) Dame Jo da Silva	Arup Group
2018	(China) Ding Jiemin	Tongji University
2019	(United Kingdom) James O'Callaghan	Eckersley O'Callaghan
2020	(United Kingdom) Michael Cook	Buro Happold
2021	(Canada) Paul Fast	Fast + Epp
2022	(India) Naeem Hussain	Arup Group
2023	(United Kingdom) Albert Williamson-Taylor	AKT II
2024	(Germany) Werner Sobek	Werner Sobek AG
2025	(United States) Glenn Bell	Simpson Gumpertz & Heger
2026	(Denmark) Tina Vejrum	COWI

== See also ==
- List of engineering awards
