= Alan Harris (engineer) =

Sir Alan Harris
- Born: 18 July 1916; Plymouth, England
- Died: 26 December 2000 (aged 84)
- Education: Northampton Polytechnic now City, University of London
- Engineering career
- Discipline: Structural engineer
- Institutions: Institution of Structural Engineers; Institution of Civil Engineers
- Practice name: Harris and Sutherland
- Projects: Prestressed concrete hangar at Heathrow Airport for BOAC maintenance headquarters 1950-5, Spekeland Road Rail Depot
- Awards: Gold Medal of the Institution of Structural Engineers in 1984

Sir Alan James Harris CBE (8 July 1916 – 26 December 2000) was a British civil and structural engineer.

== Early life and education ==
Harris was born in 1916 in Plymouth, and started working at the age of 16 taking evening classes in engineering at Northampton Engineering College now City, University of London.

== Career ==
From 1940 to 1946 Harris served with the Royal Engineers as an officer in a Port Construction and Repair Company, landing at Port-en-Bessin in Normandy on D-Day + 1. He was officer in command of diving on Mulberry B at Arromanches, working from a small fleet of French fishing boats, as a result of which he was awarded the Croix de Guerre. He later joined the Royal Engineers in the Territorial Army where he attained the rank of Colonel.

After World War II Harris went to Paris to work for Eugène Freyssinet, the pioneer of prestressed and reinforced concrete and in 1949 became Freyssinet‘s representative in England.

In 1955 Harris, his brother John, and James Sutherland set up the consulting business of Harris & Sutherland. Among other things, they designed aircraft hangars for Heathrow and Gatwick airports. Later, they expanded their work to infrastructure projects and had branches in Australia, Singapore and Hong Kong. Harris & Sutherland was acquired by Babtie, Shaw and Morton in 1997, and since 2004 has been part of Jacobs Engineering.

Harris was a vice president of the Institution of Civil Engineers. He was President of the Institution of Structural Engineers in 1978-9 and was awarded its Gold Medal in 1984. Harris was appointed a professor of concrete structures at Imperial College London in 1973.

== Awards and honours ==
- Awarded CBE in 1968 Birthday Honours
- Knighted for services to Civil Engineering in 1980 Birthday Honours
- The Gold Medal of the Institution of Structural Engineers in 1984.
- Hon DSc by the University of Exeter in 1984.
- Ordre du Mérite of France in 1975

== Selected projects ==
- Prestressed concrete hangar at Heathrow Airport for BOAC maintenance headquarters 1950–55
- Spekeland Road Rail Depot
