= Twin River Bridges (Chongqing) =

- Coordinates: 29°33′39″N 106°35′15″E
- Carries: Trains, motor vehicles, pedestrians and bicycles
- Crosses: Yangtze, Yuzhong peninsula, & Jialing River
- Locale: Chongqing, China
- Owner: Chongqing City Construction Investment Corporation and Chongqing Rail Transit Corporation

History
- Designer: China Merchants Chongqing Communications Research & Design Institute Co., Ltd. and T. Y. Lin International
- Construction cost: 1.37 billion ¥ (US$208.2 million)

Location
- Interactive map of Twin River Bridges

Dongshuimen Bridge 东水门大桥
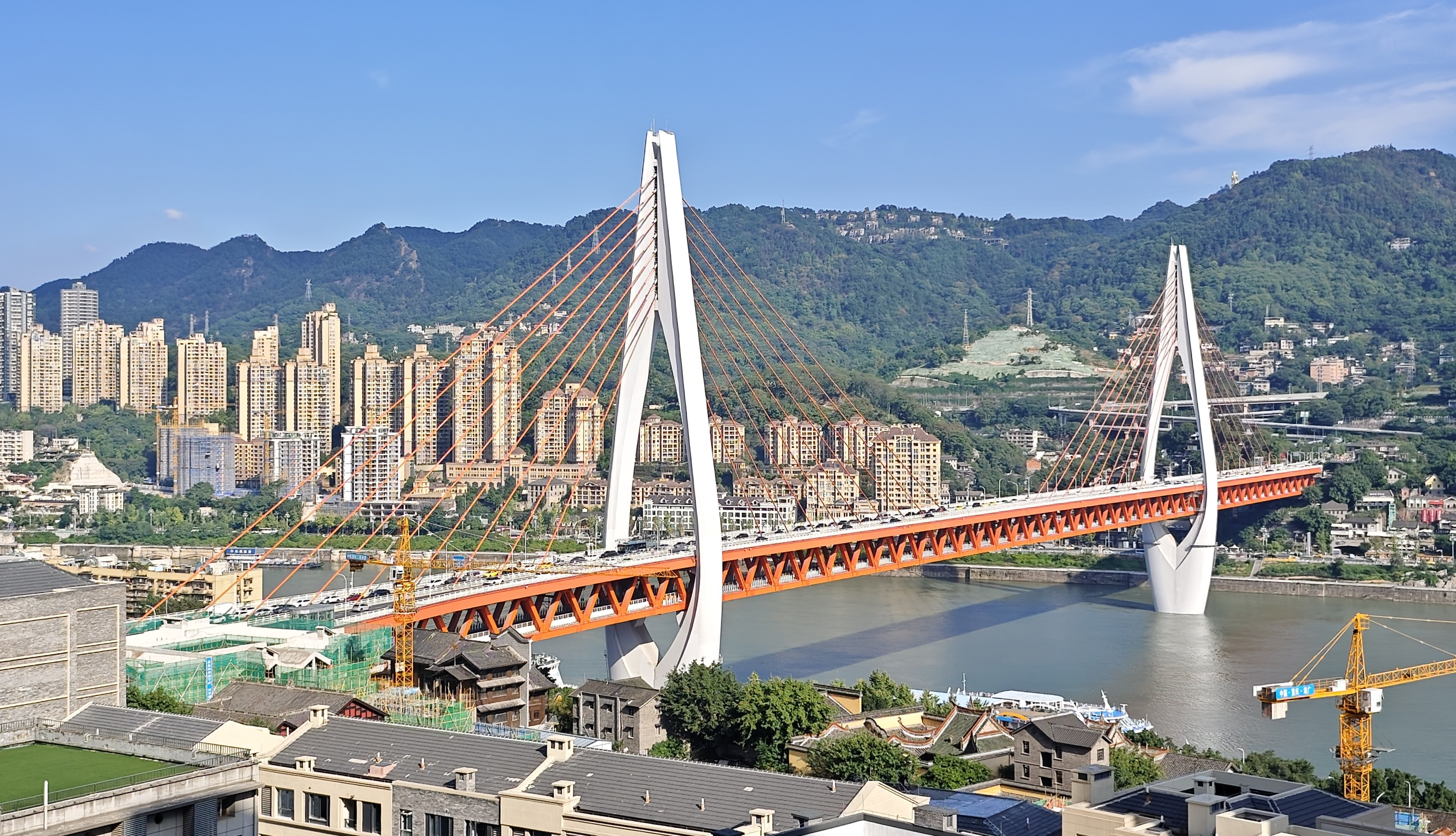
- Dongshuimen Bridge in October 2025
- Coordinates: 29.560806°N 106.587247°E
- Crosses: Yangtze River

Characteristics
- Design: Combination girder and cable-stayed bridge
- Material: Steel
- Pier construction: Concrete
- Total length: 858 m (2,815 ft)
- Longest span: 445 m (1,460 ft)
- No. of spans: 3
- Piers in water: 2

History
- Opened: April 1, 2014

Location
- Interactive map of Dongshuimen Bridge

Qiansimen Bridge 千厮门大桥
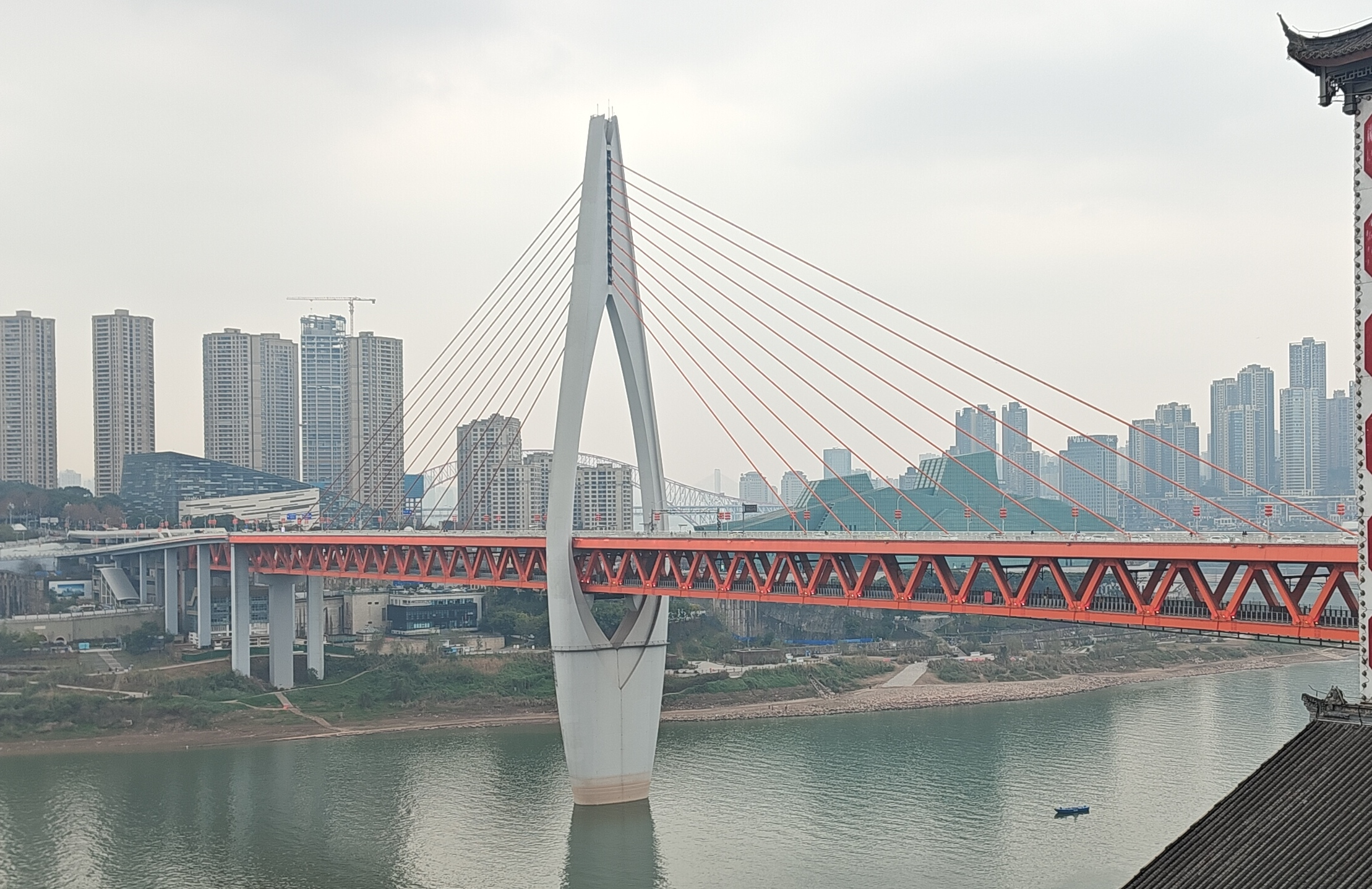
- Qiansimen Bridge in January 2024
- Coordinates: 29.568209°N 106.575610°E
- Crosses: Jialing River

Characteristics
- Design: Combination girder and cable-stayed bridge
- Material: Steel
- Pier construction: Concrete
- Total length: 720 m (2,362 ft)
- Longest span: 312 m (1,024 ft)
- No. of spans: 4
- Piers in water: 1

Location
- Interactive map of Qiansimen Bridge

The Dongshuimen Bridge (Chinese: 东水门大桥; pinyin: Dōngshuǐmén dàqiáo) and the Qiansimen Bridge (Chinese: 千厮门大桥; pinyin: Qiānsīmén dàqiáo), known collectively as the Twin River Bridges, are a pair of bridges that form a road and rail connection in Chongqing, China. Consisting of two cable-stayed bridges and a tunnel across the Yuzhong peninsula where the heart of Chongqing's commercial & financial district Jiefangbei CBD is located, the connection opened in 2014.

== Planning ==
Planning for the Twin River Bridges dates to 1947, when the alignment of the connection appeared in planning documents for Chongqing. Right of way for planned connection has been preserved since then. The plan for the crossings has always included transit rail.

By the time design of the Twin River Bridges began in 2008, it had been determined that the bridges could not be identical. Crossing of the Yangtze on the south side of the Yuzhong peninsula would require a longer main span and allow for two towers in the water. A deep shipping channel in the Jialing River would not allow for a second tower. The plan called for a double deck design with four vehicular lanes and pedestrian walkways on the top and two rail tracks beneath.

== Design ==
A design competition held in July 2008 sought signature long-span bridges which would complement the surrounding landscape. A team of China Merchants Chongqing Communications Research & Design Institute Co., Ltd. and T. Y. Lin International, led by Man-Chung Tang, won the competition. The constructed design has been called visually impactful.

The design team considered and ruled out several bridge types. A conventional cable-stayed bridge design was determined to require the towers to be 170 meters above the deck. The towers would have been taller than surrounding buildings when the 60-meter deck height was added. This was considered visually overpowering. The span requirements were too long for a conventional girder bridge. A suspension bridge design would have required anchorages that interfered with the foundations of buildings along the sides of the rivers.

The selected design combined cable-stayed bridges with a truss girder for both bridges. This option, called partially cable-stayed, "draws half of its support from the girders and half from a cable-stayed system that can rely on (shorter towers)."

== Bridges ==
The Twin River Bridges have consistent design elements and were constructed in the same timeframe (opening in 2014). The bridges have two decks. The lower deck carries two railways carrying Line 6 of Chongqing Rail Transit. The upper deck carries four lanes for motor vehicles and two pedestrian walkways.

The bridges are structurally a combination of a girder design and a cable-stayed design. The bridges use a box-girder cross section where the box girder is trussed in the elevation (or side) view. The box girder is 13 metres (43 feet) tall and 15 metres (49 feet). The pedestrian walkways cantilever from the top of the box girder, making the top deck 24 metres (79 feet) wide.

Stay cables are in a single plane. Cables connect in the center of the top deck of the box girder.

The towers are reminiscent of an ancient Chinese weaving shuttle and can also be described as needle shaped. The deck passes through the tower at its widest part, what might be considered the eye of the needle. The towers are constructed of cast-in-place concrete. The towers are 18 meters wide at the bottom, spread to a maximum width of 35 meters at the level of the upper deck, and narrow to 7 meters at the top. The water level of the rivers varies 39 meters between wet and dry seasons, controlled mainly by discharges from the Three Gorges Dam which is 570 kilometers away. At low water levels, the deck is approximately 60 meters above the water and the tower top is 100 meters above the deck.

=== Dongshuimen Bridge ===
The Dongshuimen Bridge crosses the Yangtze River with a cable-stayed main span that is 445 metres (1,460 feet) long, connecting the Yuzhong and Nan'an Districts. The bridge is 858 metres (2,815 feet) long, with asymmetric cable-stayed back span lengths of 190.5 metres (625 feet) on the Yuzhong end and 222.5 metres (730 feet) on the Nan'an end. There are nine pairs of cables connecting each tower to the deck. At the time of its opening, the length of the main span ranks the Donshuimen Bridge among the longest one hundred in the world.

The substructure was built by China Railway Construction Bridge Engineering Bureau Group Co. Ltd. The superstructure was built by China Railway Eighth Civil Engineering Group Corporation (Beijing). The bridge opened to both road and rail traffic in April 2014.

=== Qiansimen Bridge ===
The Qiansimen Bridge (sometimes Qianximen Bridge) crosses the Jialing River with a cable-stayed main span that is 312 metres (1,024 feet), connecting the Jiangbei and the Yuzhong Districts. The placement of the single tower means that the cable-stayed back span of 240 metres (787 feet) provides a secondary channel for shipping. The bridge has a total length of 720 metres (2,362 feet) as it includes girder spans of 88 metres (289 feet) and 80 metres (262 feet). The bridge has nine pairs of cables. The Qiansimen Bridge has the longest stay cable of both bridges, measuring 256.85 metres (843 feet) long. The bridge was shortlisted for an award by the Institution of Structural Engineers.

The substructure was built by China Railway Construction Bridge Engineering Bureau Group Co. Ltd. The superstructure was built by CCCC Second Harbor Engineering Co., Ltd. The bridge opened to rail traffic in April 2014 and opened to road traffic in April 2015.
