= John Roberts (engineer) =

British structural engineer

John Roberts FREng FIStructE FICE FCGI
- Born: John Maxwell Roberts; Bristol, England
- Education: University of Sheffield
- Engineering career
- Practice name: Jacobs Engineering Group
- Projects: London Eye; British Airways i360 Big One (roller coaster)
- Awards: IStructE Gold Medal

John Maxwell Roberts is a British structural engineer. He was president of the Institution of Structural Engineers (IStructE) from 1999-2000 and the 2005 recipient of their Gold Medal.

== Early life and education ==
Roberts was born in Bristol. He graduated from the University of Sheffield with a BEng (1969) and a PhD (1972) in Civil & Structural Engineering.

== Career ==
After his PhD, Roberts worked on motorway interchanges with McAlpine & Sons then in 1974 moved to Bertram Done & Partners and soon after to Allott & Lomax in Manchester as a design engineer. It was there where he worked on Big One (roller coaster). Babtie took over Allott & Lomax in 2000 and Jacobs took over Babtie in 2004. Since then Roberts has been Director of Operations at Jacobs Engineering Group. Roberts was responsible for the engineering of the London Eye (winning an award for it in 2001) and British Airways i360

== Awards and honours ==
Roberts was awarded the Gold Medal of the Institution of Structural Engineers in 2005 and an Hon DEng by the University of Sheffield in 2006.
