= Sam Thorburn =

British civil engineer

Sam Thorburn CBE FIStructE
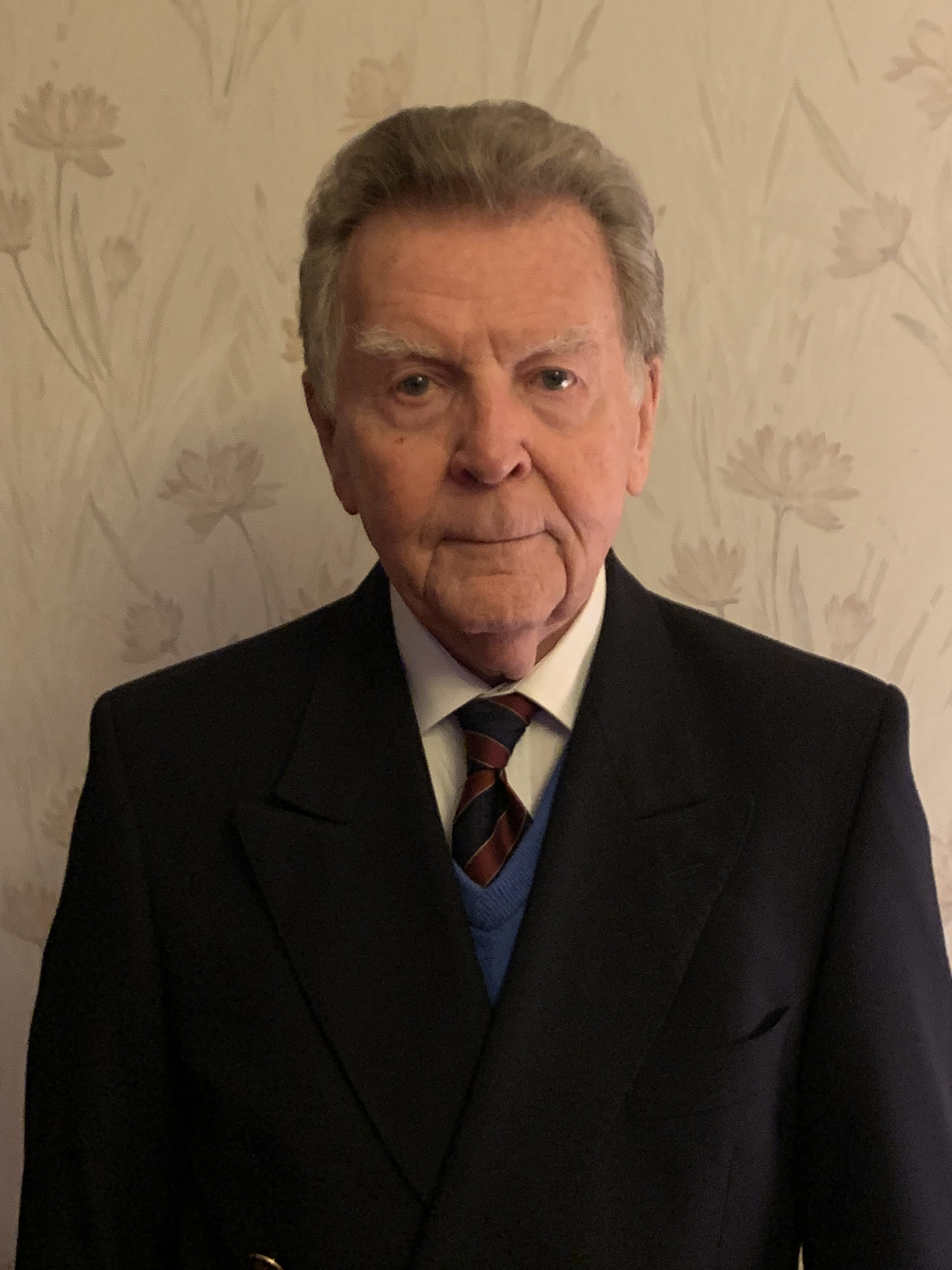
- Born: 1930 (age 95–96); Glasgow
- Education: Royal Technical College, Glasgow now the University of Strathclyde,
- Engineering career
- Discipline: Structural engineer, civil engineer
- Projects: Ibrox Stadium

Samuel Thorburn is a British civil engineer. He was president of the Institution of Structural Engineers (IStructE) in 1997-1998 and the 2003 recipient of their Gold Medal. He served as Chairman of the Scottish Building Standards Advisory Committee.

== Early life and education ==
Thorburn was educated in Hamilton Academy, which he left at 16 to work under a training agreement with a civil engineering contractor, and studied during the evening at the Royal Technical College, Glasgow — now the University of Strathclyde.

== Career ==
In 1966 Thorburn founded the consultancy known latterly as Thorburn Colquhoun. The company was taken over by American Consultant URS in 1999. One of his significant projects was the design of Ibrox Stadium, Glasgow Thorburn was Chairman of the Glasgow and West of Scotland Association of the Institution of Civil Engineers for the session 1975-76 He was appointed to the Football Licensing Authority formed in 1990 after Lord Justice Taylor's Report on the Hillsborough Disaster in 1989. He served on the Football Licensing Authority between 1993 and 2001. He was chairman of the Working Party responsible for the fourth edition of the Guide to Safety at Sports Grounds (The Green Guide 1997). He was appointed first chairman of the new Scottish Registration Board for Approved Certifiers of Design (Building Structures) formed in 2004

== Awards and honours ==
Thorburn was the first recipient of the Rear Admiral John Garth Watson Medal awarded by the Institution of Civil Engineers in 1993. He was awarded a CBE for services to Construction and Engineering in 2003. He was awarded an Hon DSc by the University of Strathclyde in 1993. He was awarded the Gold Medal of the Institution of Structural Engineers in 2003
