= Tristram Carfrae =

British-Australian structural engineer and designer

Tristram Carfrae FREng RDI FRSA FTSE
- Born: Tristram George Allen Carfrae; 1959 (age 66–67)
- Education: University of Cambridge (BA, MA)
- Employer: Arup Group
- Awards: Gold Medal of the Institution of Structural Engineers (2017)
- Website: arup.com

Tristram George Allen Carfrae (born 1 April 1959) is a structural engineer and designer. He is currently Deputy Chair of Arup and an Arup Fellow.

Carfrae was awarded the Gold Medal of the Institution of Structural Engineers in 2014. He became the fourth Briton to be awarded the International Award of Merit in Structural Engineering by the International Association for Bridge and Structural Engineering in 2018. In 2018-19 he was Master of the Royal Designers for Industry.

Working in both Australia and UK, Carfrae has contributed to the design of many projects with notable architects such as Richard Rogers, Renzo Piano, Philip Cox and Thomas Heatherwick, these include: Lloyd's of London, Stadio San Nicola, Aurora Place, City of Manchester Stadium, Beijing National Aquatics Center (the Water Cube), Helix Bridge, One One One Eagle Street, Singapore Sports Hub, Coal Drops Yard and he is currently helping to complete the design of Sagrada Familia.

== Career ==
Carfrae joined Arup in 1981 and started developing computer software for the design of fabric lightweight structures, most notably the Schlumberger Research Centre at West Cambridge completed in 1985. After working on the Richard Rogers-designed, Grade I listed, Lloyd's of London, Carfrae moved to Sydney, Australia for a year in 1986 and was lead engineer for the Sydney Football Stadium with architect Philip Cox.

On return to London in 1987, he joined Peter Rice and completed the engineering design of Renzo Piano's Stadio San Nicola for the 1990 FIFA World Cup and the structural stone façade for the Pavilion of the Future at Seville Expo '92. After six months in Tokyo, Carfrae returned to Sydney in 1990 and renewed his relationship with Philip Cox working together to design the Brisbane Convention Exhibition Centre. He spent the rest of the nineties designing notable projects such as Sydney Airport Air Traffic Control Tower (architect Ken Woolley), Cairns Convention Centre and Singapore Expo (both with Philip Cox), Munich Airport Centre, with American architect Helmut Jahn and Aurora Place with Renzo Piano. He concluded the nineties with three projects for the 2000 Summer Olympics – Dunc Gray Velodrome (architect Paul Ryder), Sydney Olympic Park Tennis Centre (architect Lawrence Nield) and Sydney Showground Dome and Exhibition (Ken Woolley).

In 1999 Carfrae returned to London for two years and helped lead the Arup architectural practice, Arup Associates and designed the City of Manchester Stadium for the 2002 Commonwealth Games.

Back in Sydney from 2001, Carfrae's creative partnership with Philip Cox resulted in Khalifa International Stadium, Northern Stand at the Melbourne Cricket Ground for the 2006 Commonwealth Games, Kurilpa Bridge, Helix Bridge, Melbourne Rectangular Stadium, One One One Eagle Street and Adelaide Oval. Other notable Carfrae projects during the first decade of the 21st century include Lang Park stadium (with Populous) and the sustainability strategy for Barangaroo, New South Wales (for Lendlease with Richard Rogers). Just before returning to London, Carfrae designed the world's largest dome for the Singapore Sports Hub.

Back in London in 2011, Carfrae led the design team for the never-built and controversial London Garden Bridge with Thomas Heatherwick – they continued to design Coal Drops Yard. The new passenger terminal for Kuwait International Airport with Foster and Partners is currently under construction.

Since 2015, Carfrae has been working with the Sagrada Familia Foundation to help complete the design of Antoni Gaudi's church in Barcelona.

=== Awards and honours ===
Carfrae was awarded the title of Royal Designer for Industry (RDI) in 2006 by the Royal Society of Arts.

He was awarded the Gold Medal of the Institution of Structural Engineers in 2014.

In 2024 he was awarded the Sir Frank Whittle medal, "one of the Royal Academy of Engineering’s highest accolades, in recognition of his inspirational approach to design, his remarkable structures and his leadership in structural engineering."
