= Leslie E. Robertson =

American engineer (1928–2021)

- Born: Leslie Earl Robertson; February 12, 1928; Manhattan Beach, California, U.S.
- Died: February 11, 2021 (aged 92); San Mateo, California, U.S.
- Education: University of California, Berkeley (BS)
- Spouse(s): Elizabeth Zublin (divorced); Sharon Hibino (divorced) SawTeen See (m. 1982)
- Engineering career
- Discipline: Structural engineer
- Institutions: National Academy of Engineering; Institution of Structural Engineers
- Practice name: Leslie E. Robertson Associates (LERA), now named LERA Consulting Structural Engineers
- Projects: World Trade Center; Shanghai World Financial Center; Bank of China Tower, Hong Kong
- Awards: John Fritz Medal (2012); IStructE Gold Medal

Leslie Earl Robertson (February 12, 1928 – February 11, 2021) was an American engineer. He was the lead structural engineer of the Twin Towers of the original World Trade Center in New York City, and served as structural engineer on numerous other projects, including the U.S. Steel Tower in Pittsburgh, Shanghai World Financial Center, and the Bank of China Tower in Hong Kong.

== Early life and education ==
Robertson was born on February 12, 1928, in Manhattan Beach, California to Tinabel (née Grantham) and Garnet Robertson. His mother was a homemaker, while his father worked assorted jobs. His parents divorced when he was a child and he was brought up by his father's second wife, Zelda (née Ziegel). He was briefly enlisted in the navy in 1945, at the age of 17. However, he did not enter active duty.

He studied civil engineering at the University of California, Berkeley, graduating with a Bachelor of Science degree in 1952.

== Career ==
Robertson's engineering career began in 1952, when he joined Kaiser Engineering. He worked as a mathematician, structural engineer, and electrical engineer during this time. He was also part of the investigation team studying the collapse of an offshore drilling platform. He later went on a road trip and ran out of funds in Seattle, where he then joined the Seattle-based structural and civil engineering firm Worthington and Skilling in 1958.

In 1967 Robertson was made a partner in WSHJ, which was renamed Skilling, Helle, Christiansen, Robertson. The firm split its operations in 1982, with Robertson renaming the east coast operations Leslie E. Robertson Associates RLLP. Robertson retired from the partnership in 1994, but continued to work for the firm on projects until 2012.

Robertson was involved in structural engineering and design for skyscrapers, including the U.S. Steel Headquarters in Pittsburgh, the Shanghai World Financial Center, and the Bank of China Tower in Hong Kong designed by the Chinese-American architect I. M. Pei, and Puerta de Europa in Madrid. Robertson also engineered the building of museums in Seattle, Portland, Maine, and Berlin, in addition to theaters and bridges. He structurally engineered the installation of American sculptor Richard Serra's works. He also helped coordinate the 1978 repair of New York City's Citigroup Center, which had been built with bolted joints that placed it in serious danger of collapse during a high wind.

When Seattle-born American architect Minoru Yamasaki won the competition to design the World Trade Center, Robertson and his firm Worthington, Skilling, Helle, and Jackson (WSHJ) got the engineering contract. Designed between 1966 and 1971, this was the firm's and Robertson's first high rise construction. His interactions with Yamasaki led to the conceptualization of the tube design for the buildings with exterior columns that were two feet apart along the building's height, specifically designed to provide a sense of enclosure for people in the building. This also meant that, unlike most skyscrapers of the time that were supported by concrete or steel frames with columns interrupting the interiors, the WTC design permitted column-free interiors, with the weight being handled by the exterior columns and the steel and concrete cores. Steel trusses supported the floors and connect exterior columns and the central cores.

Since the collapse of the World Trade Center in 2001, debates about the safety of rent-space-maximized designs have engaged the building professions, but the consensus among architects and engineers is that the World Trade Center actually withstood the impact of the plane with enough time to allow many thousands of occupants to evacuate safely. Robertson's firm later participated in the development of a database of basic structural information for the towers of the World Trade Center (WTC1 and 2) for NIST and FEMA, and to record the undocumented structural changes that had been made to the buildings after construction began. His firm also stayed for the structural engineering of the 4 World Trade Center building which came up at the same complex.

Selected works by Robertson

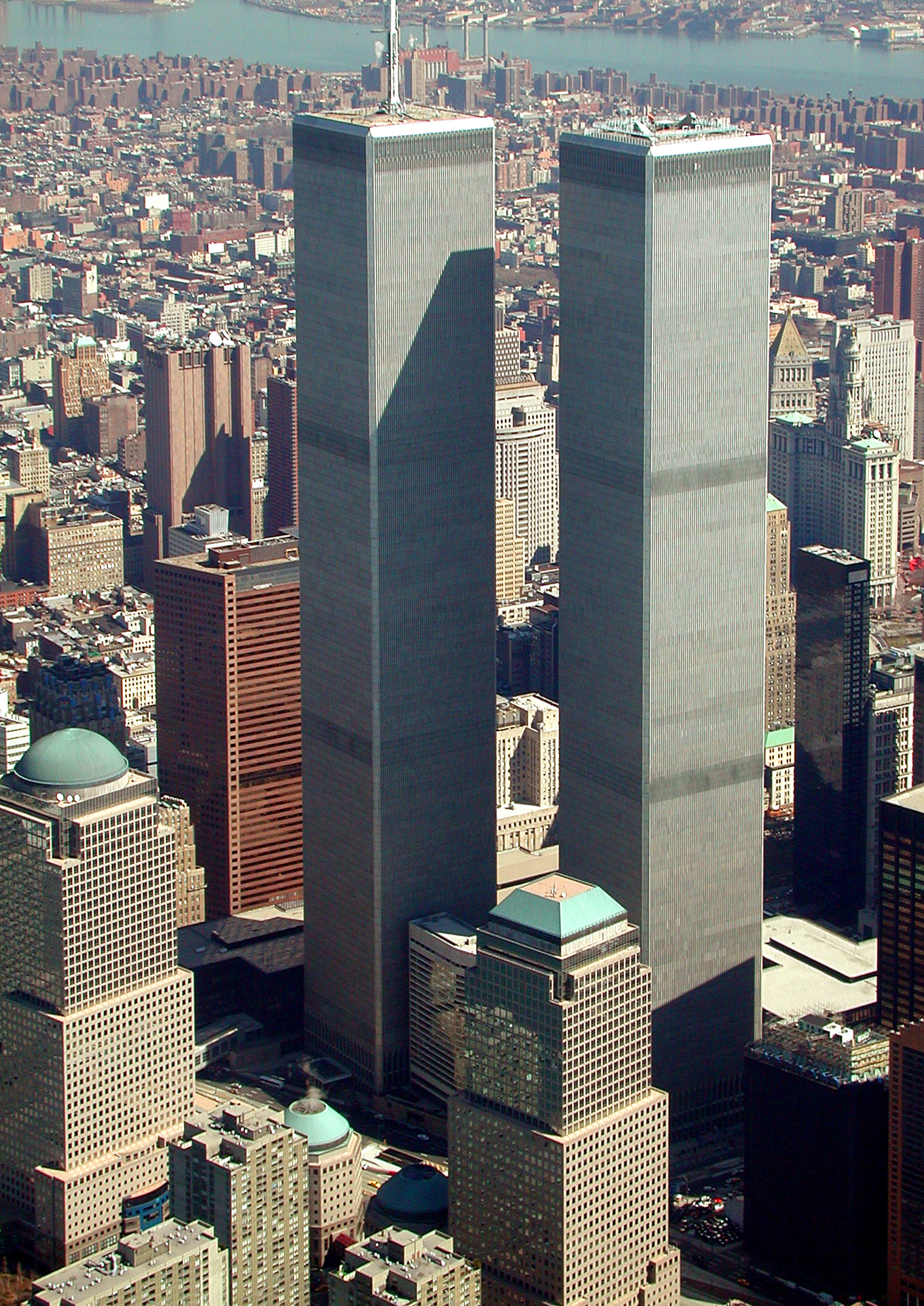
World Trade Center, Manhattan, New York City

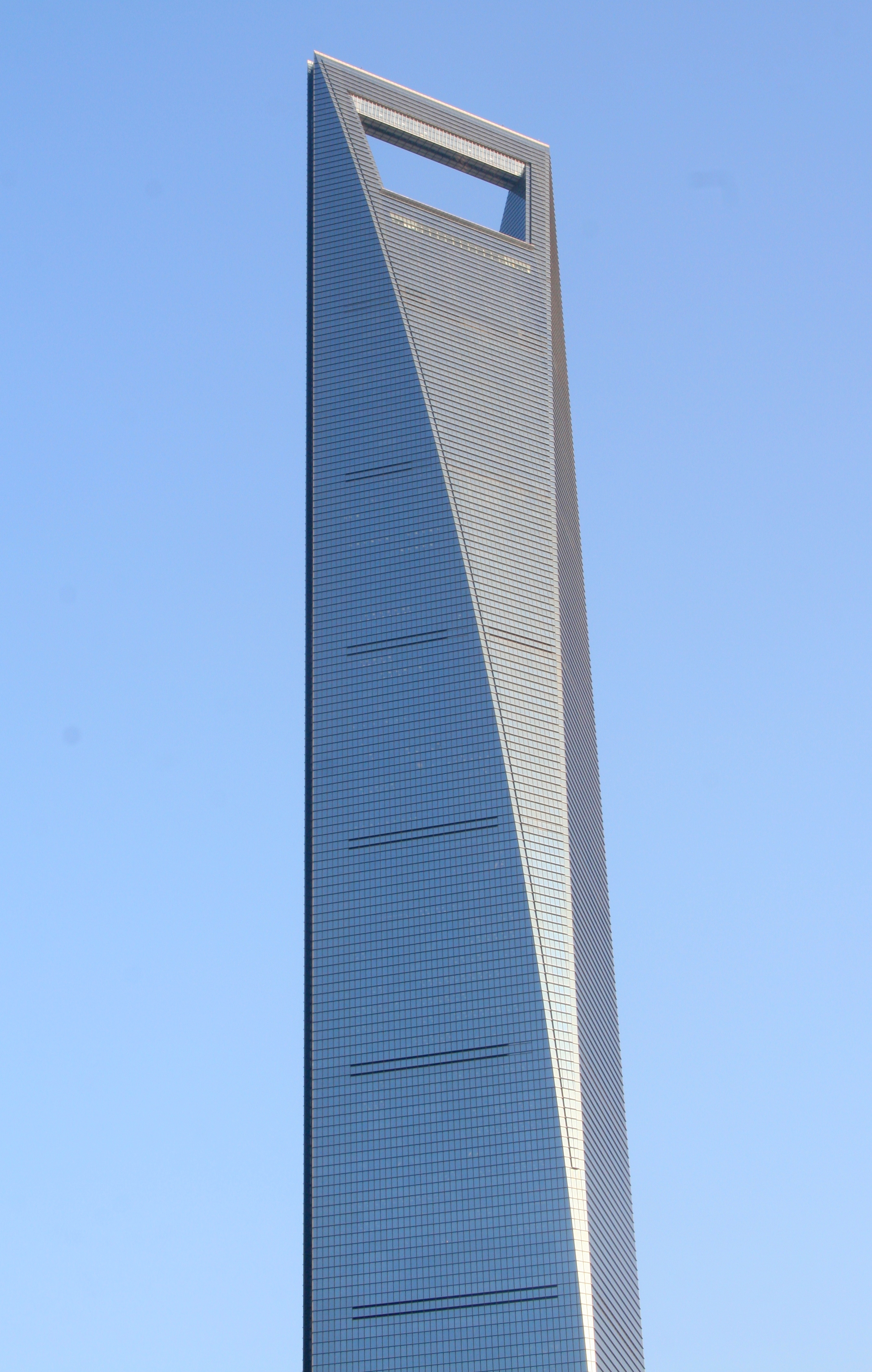
Shanghai World Financial Center, Shanghai

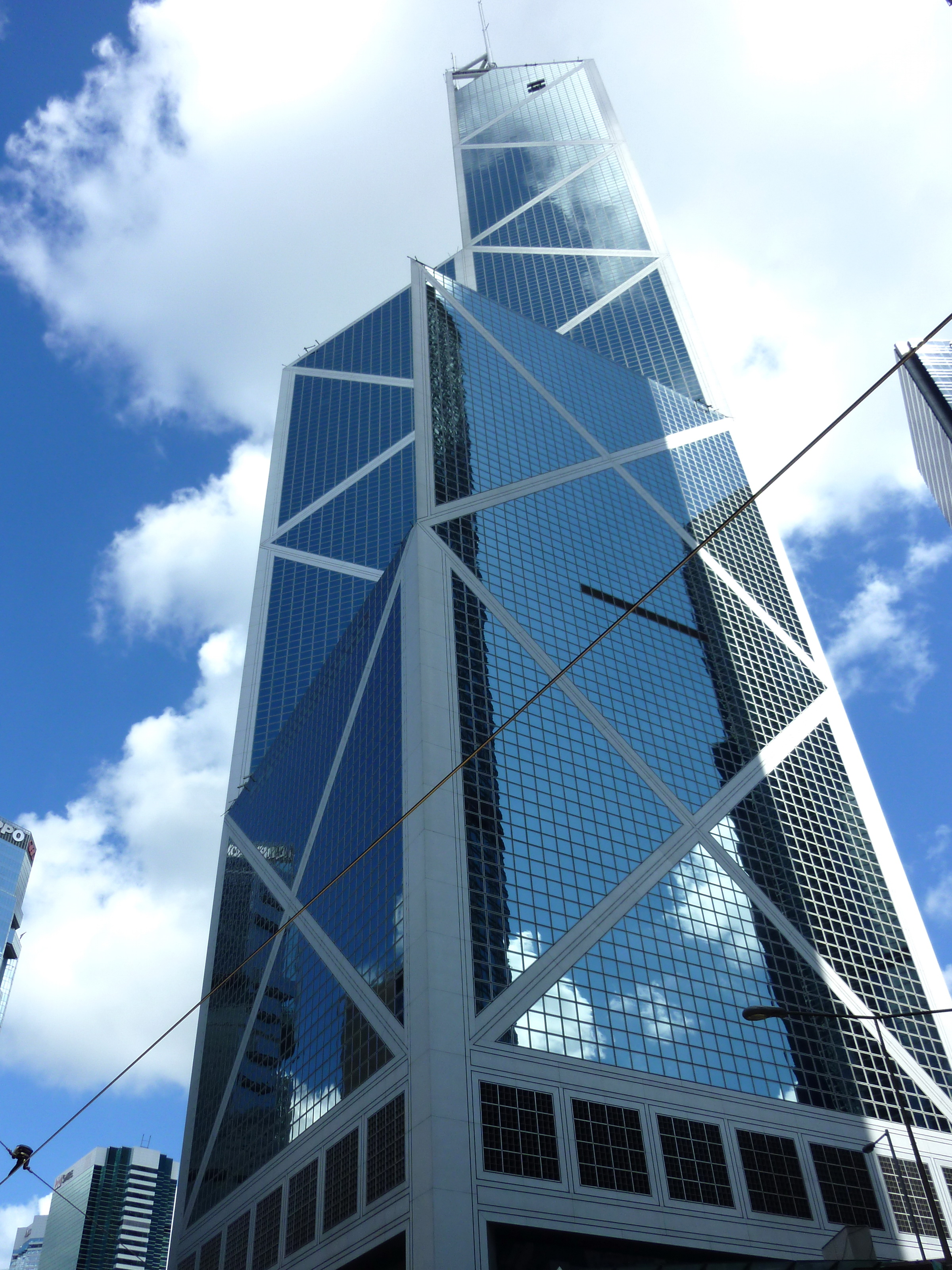
Bank of China Tower, Hong Kong

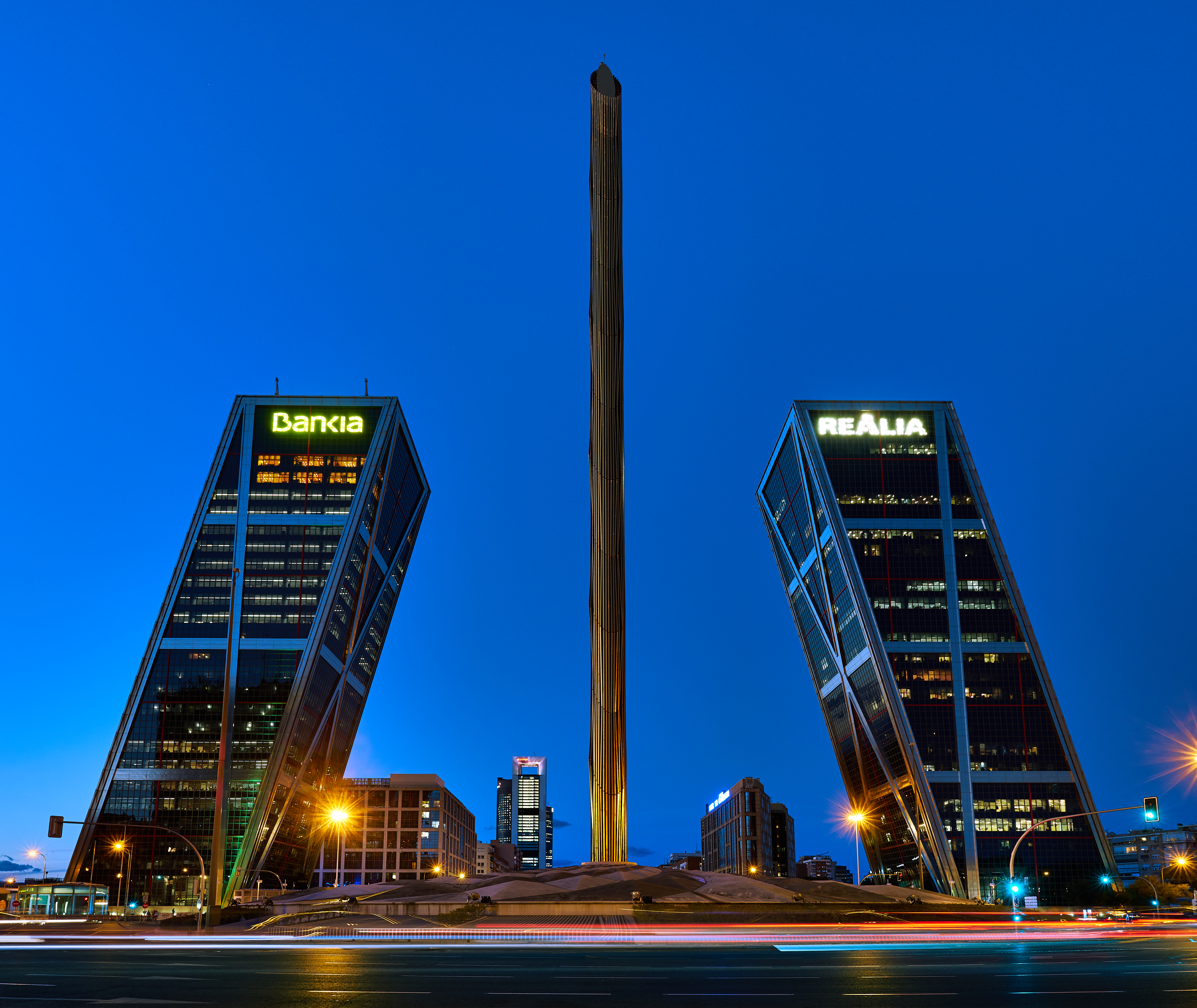
Puerta de Europa, Madrid

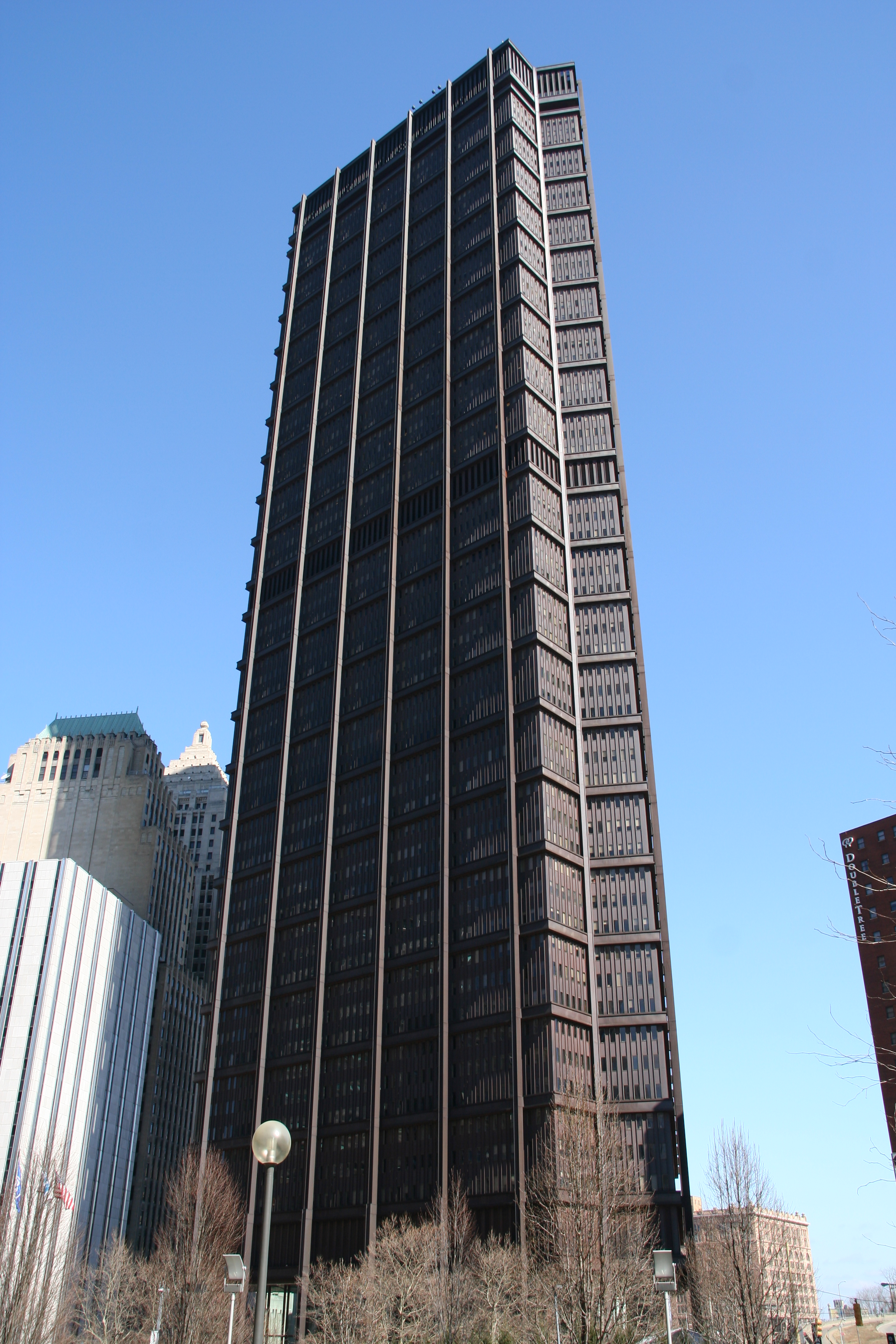
U.S. Steel Tower, Pittsburgh

== Personal life ==
Robertson was married to Elizabeth Zublin and later to Sharon Hibino, with both marriages ending in divorce. In 1982 he married SawTeen See, a structural engineer who also has served as managing partner of their architectural engineering practice, Leslie E. Robertson Associates (LERA), now called See Robertson Structural Engineers, LLC.

Robertson died from multiple myeloma at his home in San Mateo, California, on February 11, 2021, the day before his 93rd birthday.

== Books ==
- Robertson, Leslie Earl (2017). The Structure of Design: An Engineer's Extraordinary Life in Architecture. Monacelli Press. ISBN 978-1-58093-429-9. OCLC 992528782.

== Awards ==
- 1975 Member of the National Academy of Engineering for "contributions in the design of tall buildings and development and application of wind-engineering principles to tall-building design for assurance of safety and comfort of the occupants"
- 1986 Honorary degree, Doctor of Engineering, Rensselaer Polytechnic Institute
- 1989 Honorary degree, Doctor of Science, University of Western Ontario
- 1989 Construction's Man of the Year (now known as the Award of Excellence) by the Engineering News-Record for his work developing efficient structural systems and championing wind engineering research
- 1991 Honorary degree, Doctor of Engineering, Lehigh University
- 1993 Mayors Award for Excellence in Science and Technology for contributions to the design of the World Trade Center. World Trade Center Individual Service Medal for contributions to the reconstruction of the World Trade Center following the 1993 bombing.
- 1993 Gengo Matsui Prize of Japan
- 2002 Henry C. Turner Prize for Innovation in Construction Technology from the National Building Museum
- 2003 Honorary degree, Doctor of Engineering, University of Notre Dame
- 2003 ASCE OPAL Award for lifetime contributions to design
- 2004 IStructE Gold Medal of the Institution of Structural Engineers
- 2004 The Fazlur Khan Lifetime Achievement Medal from the Council on Tall Buildings and Urban Habitat for leadership in Structural Design
- 2006 Distinguished Member of the American Society of Civil Engineers
- 2008 Elevated to National Honor Member of Chi Epsilon national civil engineering honor society
- 2011 International Award of Merit in Structural Engineering from the International Association for Bridge and Structural Engineering
- 2012 John Fritz Medal from the American Association of Engineering Societies
- 2015 International Civil Engineering Award from the José Entrecanales Ibarra Foundation

== See also ==
- Christopher O. Ward
