= David A. Nethercot =

British structural engineer

Professor David A. Nethercot OBE FREng FIStructE FICE FCGI

Professor of Civil Engineering, Imperial College of Science, Technology and Medicine/Imperial College London
- In office 1999–2011

Professor of Civil Engineering,. University of Nottingham
- In office 1989–1999

Personal details
- Born: David Arthur Nethercot; 26 April 1946 (age 80)

David Arthur Nethercot (born 26 April 1946) is a British structural engineer.

He was the Head of the Civil Engineering Department at Imperial College London until September 2011. He was president of the Institution of Structural Engineers (IStructE) in 2003-04 and the 2009 recipient of their Gold Medal.

In June 2012 he became President of the City & Guilds College Association, the association for engineering alumni of Imperial College. 1 November 2013 he became President of the International Association for Bridge and Structural Engineering (IABSE).

== See also ==
- Imperial College Civil & Environmental Engineering
