= Peter Thomas Dunican =

Peter Thomas Dunica
- Born: 15 March 1918
- Died: 18 December 1989 (aged 71); London, United Kingdom
- Engineering career
- Discipline: Structural engineer
- Institutions: Institution of Structural Engineers
- Practice name: Arup
- Projects: Brynmawr Rubber Factory, Busáras
- Awards: CBE

Peter Thomas Dunican (15 March 1918 – 18 December 1989) was a structural engineer and former chairman of Ove Arup & Partners.

== Life and career ==
Involved in Ove Arup & Partners from its early days, and becoming a partner in 1956, Peter Dunican is widely regarded as the right-hand man of Ove Arup, the firm's founder. In the words of Jack Zunz and Peter Hobbs, other senior partners from the firm, after his death in 1989:

"If Ove is the architect-philosopher, Peter is the builder, the doer who moulded the philosophies into workable arrangements whereby so many hundreds of talented people have come together to work under the Arup banner."

Dunican became chairman of the Ove Arup Partnership, a trust which owned Ove Arup & Partners on behalf of its staff, in 1977.

As senior partner at Arup from 1956, Dunican is credited with overseeing much of its growth from a single office in London in 1946 to a firm of over 15000 staff (in 2020). He also worked on many of the firms most iconic projects, including the Sydney Opera House, Coventry Cathedral, Centre Pompidou, the Barbican Estate and others.

He was elected a Fellow of the Royal Academy of Engineering in 1978, president of the Institution of Structural Engineers for 1977–78 and was appointed CBE in the 1977 New Year Honours.

He died in 1989.
