= Michael Horne (engineer) =

English structural engineer, scientist and academic

Michael Horne OBE FRS FREng FICE FIStructE

Beyer Professor of Civil Engineering, University of Manchester
- In office 1978–1983

Professor of Civil Engineering, University of Manchester
- In office 1960–1978

Personal details
- Born: Michael Rex Horne; 29 December 1921 Leicester, England
- Died: 6 January 2000 (aged 78)
- Spouse: Dorcas Mary Hewitt
- Education: Boston Grammar School, Leeds Grammar School, St John's College, Cambridge
- Occupation: Structural engineer
- Awards: Gold Medal of the Institution of Structural Engineers
- Scientific career
- Institutions: Institution of Structural Engineers; Institution of Civil Engineers; Royal Society; Royal Academy of Engineering

Michael Rex Horne (29 December 1921 – 6 January 2000) was an English structural engineer, scientist and academic who pioneered the theory of the Plastic Design of Structures.

== Early life and education ==
Horne was born in Leicester, England on 29 December 1921. He was educated at Boston Grammar School, Leeds Grammar School and St John's College, Cambridge, where he graduated in Mechanical Sciences with first class honours in 1941

== Career ==
After graduation Horne worked as an assistant engineer for the River Great Ouse Catchment Board before moving back to Cambridge to work with John Baker, Baron Baker, de:Jacques Heyman and Bernard Neal. In 1960 Horne moved to the chair of Civil Engineering at the University of Manchester. Horne served on the Merrison Committee of Enquiry into the Collapse of Box Girder Bridges Horne was President of the Institution of Structural Engineers in 1980–81

== Awards and honours ==
- Honorary DSc University of Salford 1981
- The Institution of Civil Engineers Telford Premiums in 1956, 1966 and 1978 and their Baker Medal in 1977.
- The Institution of Structural Engineers Henry Adams award in 1970-71 and their Oscar Faber Bronze medal in 1972–3.
- The Gold Medal of the Institution of Structural Engineers in 1986 and their Kerensky Medal 1988

== Books ==
- Baker J F, Horne M R, Heyman J (1956) The Steel Skeleton I, II, Cambridge University Press, UK
- Horne M R (2014) Plastic Theory of Structures: In SI/Metric Units (2nd Edition), Elsevier Science, ISBN 9781483188454
