= Michael Horne =

Michael Horne may refer to:

- Michael Horne (engineer), English structural engineer
- Michael Horne (physicist), American quantum physicist
