= Mike Glover (engineer) =

British engineer

- Engineering career
- Discipline: Civil engineer Structural engineer
- Institutions: Institution of Civil Engineers; Institution of Structural Engineers; Royal Academy of Engineering
- Practice name: Arup
- Projects: Channel Tunnel Rail Link, HSBC Headquarters, Hong Kong
- Awards: IStructE Gold Medal; Sir Frank Whittle Medal; Arup Fellowship

Michael John Glover (born 1946) is a British Engineer and a director of Arup and technical director of 'Rail Link Engineering'.

== Career ==
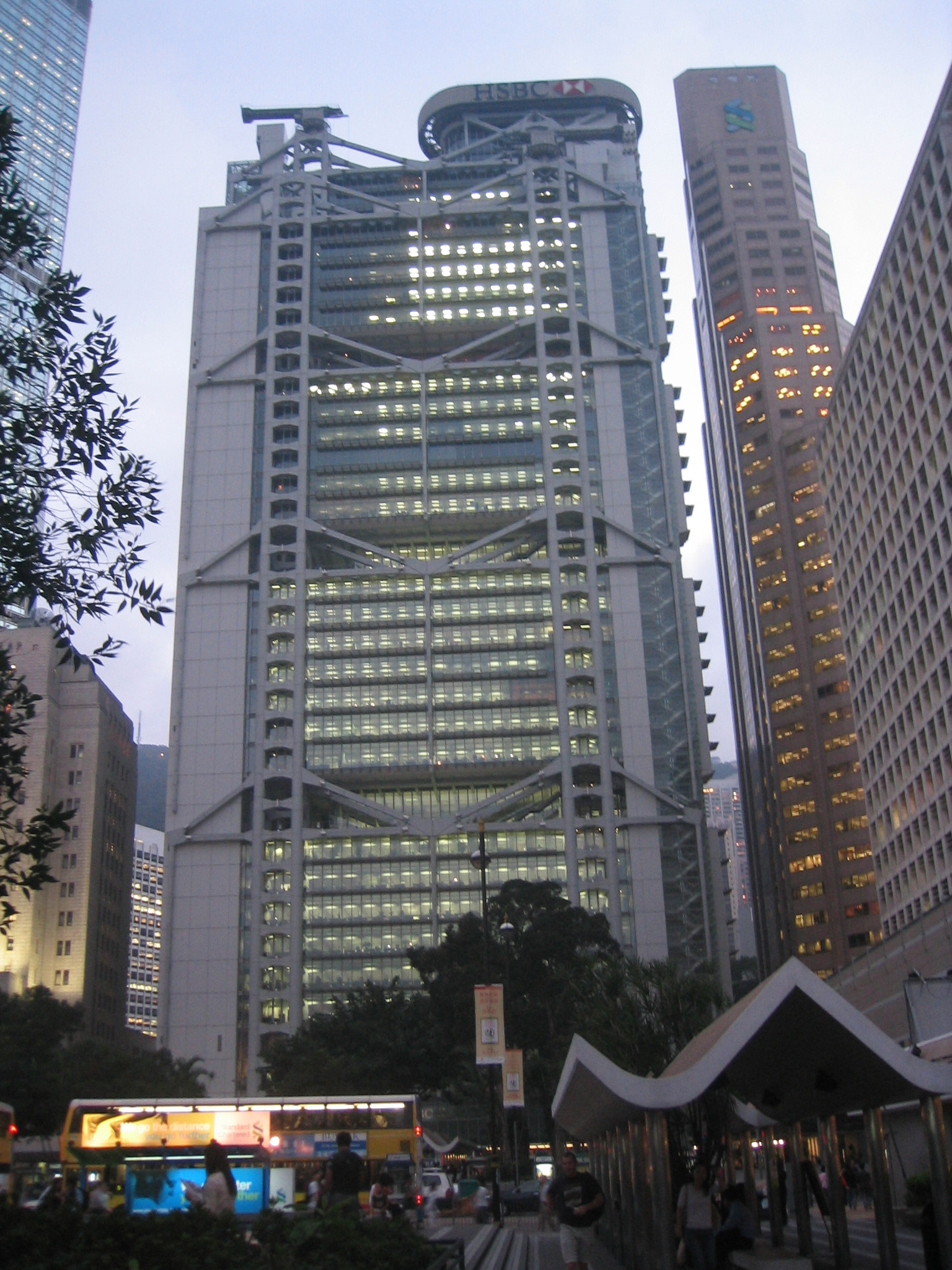
Hong Kong Headquarters of HSBC Bank

Mike Glover joined Arup as a graduate of the University of Surrey in 1969 and trained as a civil and structural engineer. He worked on Foster and Partners' Hong Kong & Shanghai Bank headquarters in Hong Kong, followed by the design and execution of projects in the oil and gas industry. He subsequently became Technical Director and Deputy Project Director for the £5.8bn high speed Channel Tunnel Rail Link (CTRL), a position he has held throughout its design, construction, commissioning and handover.

== Awards ==
Glover was made a fellow of Arup in 2006, to "recognise the highest design and technical achievements of an Arup person".

Glover was awarded the 2007 Sir Frank Whittle Medal by the Royal Academy of Engineering, and the Gold Medal of the Institution of Structural Engineers in 2008 'for his outstanding contributions to the design and construction of major multi-disciplinary projects, including tall buildings, energy projects and large transportation and infrastructure projects around the world'.

In 2009 Glover was awarded an OBE in the New Year's honours list. This was for services to engineering.

In 2012 Glover was awarded an honorary doctorate by the University of Surrey
