= Paul Westbury =

Paul Westbury CBE FREng FICE FIStructE

Chief executive officer, Buro Happold
- Incumbent
- Assumed office March 2011

Personal details
- Occupation: Structural engineer

Paul Westbury is the CEO of the engineering company Buro Happold.

== Career ==
Westbury graduated from Jesus College, Cambridge University with a first-class degree in engineering science. He then joined BuroHappold Engineering in 1991. In 2000, he was made a partner of BuroHappold Engineering and now is a chartered structural engineer.

He developed a specialisation in sports and entertainment buildings and has led the teams responsible for engineering on several award-winning projects. Following several senior positions within the company, Westbury took on the role of CEO at Buro Happold Engineering in March 2011. He has written and presented several technical papers and lectured at Cambridge, Yale, and the Massachusetts Institute of Technology (MIT).

== Recognitions and awards ==
Westbury is a Fellow of the Institution of Civil Engineers, the Royal Academy of Engineering, the Institution of Structural Engineers, and the Royal Society for Arts, Manufacture & Commerce.

In 2008 he was awarded a Royal Academy of Engineering Silver Medal. He was named in The Times' "top 100 scientists" list for 2010, and 2 years later in 2012, he was awarded the Gold Medal of the Institution of Structural Engineers, their most prestigious award. Westbury is a judge for the Queen Elizabeth Prize for Engineering, a £1,000,000 biennial prize aimed at promoting the essential contribution of the profession around the globe.

Westbury was made a CBE in the 2013 New Year Honours.
