= T. Y. Lin International =

Infrastructure services firm

TYLin
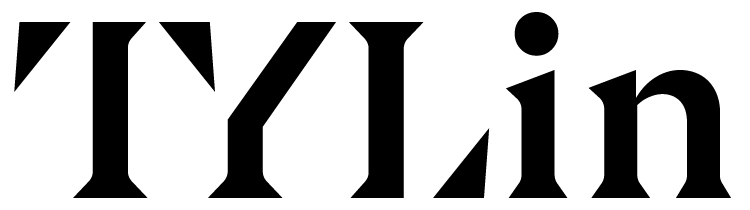
- Company type: Private
- Industry: Civil and Structural Engineering
- Founded: June 1, 1954
- Headquarters: San Francisco, California, US
- Key people: Matthew G. Cummings, P.E.; (President); Man-Chung Tang, Dr., P.E.; (Chairman of the Board)
- Website: Official website

TYLin is a global, multi-disciplinary engineering firm. Headquartered in San Francisco, California, TYLin established its business in the design of long-span bridges and specialty structures.

The firm provides a range of planning, design, construction and project management services to the aviation; bridge; facilities; mobility, planning, and management; ports and marine; rail and transit; and surface transportation industries. TYLin operates from more than 50 regional centers across four continents, and employs a professional staff of more than 3,000 engineers, planners, architects and scientists.

== History ==
1950s: T.Y. Lin International was founded on June 1, 1954, by Tung-Yen Lin, a Chinese-American structural engineer recognized worldwide as an innovator in bridge design, engineering, and construction. Lin is credited with standardizing the practical use of prestressed concrete. He is also known for his emphasis on the structural aesthetics aspect of engineering, regardless of a project's economic limitations.

1960s–1970s: Lin continued to expand his firm's specialty in prestressed concrete to broader consulting services, with projects that included conventionally reinforced concrete, structural steel, masonry, and timber-framed structures. In 1967, he designed the 18-story shear wall Bank of America building in Managua, Nicaragua. The reinforced concrete tower was one of only two structures left standing after the country's 1972 earthquake. Lin also became known for his design innovations, such as the Rio Colorado Bridge, an upside-down suspension bridge spanning a deep gorge in Costa Rica. In the early '70s, the firm also established offices in Taiwan and Singapore.

1980s: T.Y. Lin International expanded with new offices in Kuala Lumpur and a merger with Maine-based Hunter-Bellow Associates in the U.S. In 1986, when U.S. President Ronald Reagan presented Lin with the National Medal of Science, he responded by handing the former president a detailed plan for a 50-mile-long (80 km) “Intercontinental Peace Bridge” connecting Alaska and Siberia across the Bering Strait. In 1989, T.Y. Lin International was acquired by the Dar Group, an international network of professional service firms located in 45 countries.

1990s: Following the Loma Prieta earthquake in California in late 1989, T.Y. Lin International helped in the development of advanced techniques, engineering tools, and design standards for bridge assessment, the seismic retrofit of existing structures, and the design of new bridges. The firm also completed several acquisitions, including California-based McDaniel Engineering, Chicago-based BASCOR, Washington State's DGES Consulting Engineering, and New York's DRC Consultants. Additionally, the firm opened a new Asia-Pacific office in Chongqing, China.

2000s: U.S. expansion continued with the acquisition of Miami-based H.J. Ross Associates, Inc., Northern California's CCS Planning and Engineering, multi-location FRA Engineering and Architecture, and Medina Consultants on the East Coast. The acquisitions strengthened the firm's services in the areas of ITS/traffic engineering and transportation engineering through its aviation and rail and transit line of businesses for such projects as Miami International Airport's expansion project. In Asia, T.Y. Lin International oversaw the design of major bridges in China's fast-growing central region, including the Shibanpo Bridge and the Caiyunba Bridge in Chongqing, and the Second Wujiang Bridge in Fulin.

2010s: T.Y. Lin International oversaw the design of 25 elevated bridges across Taiwan for the island's new High Speed Rail system and the Hoover Dam Bypass Bridge, which is downstream of the Hoover Dam; the Port Mann Bridge in British Columbia; Canada (2012); the new Eastern Span of the San Francisco-Oakland Bay Bridge (2013) and the Champlain Bridge, Montreal (2019-present), also called the Samuel De Champlain Bridge, in Montreal, Quebec, Canada.

2020s: In 2023, T.Y. Lin was awarded Lead Designer in a progressive design build (PDB) contract to develop, design, and construct a replacement of two 2-lane bridges over a 10-mile segment of highway between Mobile, Alabama and Spanish Fort, Alabama.

== Services ==
TYLin provides services on all phases of project development and delivery, including:

- Construction Engineering
- Construction Support and Inspection
- Design
- Design-Build
- Intelligent Transportation Systems
- Planning
- Program Management
- Wastewater
- Water Resources

== Industries ==
TYLin provides services within all major sectors of the infrastructure industry, including:

- Airports
- Bridges
- Buildings
- Federal Facilities
- Land Development
- Ports & Marine
- Rail & Transit
- Roadway Systems
- Water Systems

== Projects ==
Select project list:

- Arizona Veterans Memorial Coliseum – Phoenix, Arizona
- Arthur Ravenel Jr. Bridge – Charleston, South Carolina
- Automated People Mover Guideway, Orlando International Airport – Orlando, Florida
- Bataan–Cavite Interlink Bridge – Manila Bay, Philippines
- Bayshore Bikeway – San Diego, California
- Brookfield Floating Bridge (Sunset Lake Floating Bridge) Brookfield, Vermont
- Caijia Bridge – Chongqing, China
- Caiyuanba Yangtze River Bridge – Chongqing, China
- California High-Speed Rail – Central Valley Line
- California Incline Bridge and Idaho Avenue Pedestrian Overcrossing – Santa Monica, California
- Champlain Bridge, Montreal (2019-present),(Samuel De Champlain Bridge) – Montreal, Quebec, Canada
- Cermak-McCormick Place station – Chicago, Illinois
- Jamuna Bridge – Tangail and Sirajganj, Bangladesh
- Cinta Costera - Panama City, Panama
- Chicago Transit Authority (CTA) Red Line Modernization – Chicago, Illinois
- CTA Blue Line Station Improvements – Chicago, Illinois
- Red Line (CTA) and Purple Line (CTA) Modernization – Chicago, Illinois
- Dublin Link – Dublin, Ohio
- Egongyan Rail Transit Bridge – Chongqing, China
- El Dorado International Airport – Bogota, Colombia
- Elgin-O’Hare Western Access Project, Illinois Route 390 – DuPage and Cook Counties, Illinois
- Eller Drive and Intermodal Container Transfer Facility (ICTF) Overpass - Broward County, Florida
- 4th Bridge over the Panama Canal – Panama City, Panama
- I-25/Cerrillos Road Diverging diamond interchange – Santa Fe, New Mexico
- I-395 Miami Corridor Reconstruction – Miami, Florida
- I Street Bridge Replacement – Sacramento, California
- Interstate 10/Jefferson Street Interchange - Indio, California
- Joliet Gateway Center – Joliet, Illinois
- Kenneth F. Burns Memorial Bridge - Lake Quinsigamond, Central Massachusetts
- Los Angeles International Airport, Los Angeles World Airports Utility and Landside Access Modernization Program Enabling Project – Los Angeles, California
- Miami International Airport – Miami, Florida
- Mike O'Callaghan – Pat Tillman Memorial Bridge (Hoover Dam Bypass Bridge) – Arizona-Nevada
- Navy Pier Flyover Lakefront Trail Improvements – Chicago, Illinois
- Niagara Falls State Park Rehabilitation – Niagara Falls, New York
- Panama Metro Line 1 - Panama City, Panama
- Panama Metro Line 2 - Panama City, Panama
- Port of Miami Tunnel – Miami, Florida
- Port Mann Bridge – Vancouver, BC, Canada
- Puente Centenario - Panama Canal – Republic of Panama
- Rex T. Barber Veterans Memorial Bridge – Jefferson County, Oregon
- San Francisco–Oakland Bay Bridge New East Span (Bay Bridge) – Oakland, California
- Sellwood Bridge – Portland, Oregon
- Sidney Lanier Bridge – Brunswick, Georgia
- Sheikh Jaber Al-Ahmad Al-Sabah Causeway – Kuwait
- South Carolina Aeronautical Training Center for Trident Technical College – N. Charleston, South Carolina
- Taiwan Taoyuan International Airport – Taipei, Taiwan
- The Esplanade – Theatres on the Bay – Singapore
- Tilikum Crossing, Bridge of the People – Portland, Oregon
- Tocumen International Airport Expansion Program - Panama City, Panama
- Twin River Bridges – Chongqing, China
- Victoria Theatre and Concert Hall – Singapore
- Wacker Drive Reconstruction – Chicago, Illinois
- United States Military Academy – West Point, New York
