= Man-Chung Tang =

American engineer and businessman

- 鄧文中
- Born: 1938 (age 87–88); Zhaoqing, China
- Education: Chu Hai College, TU Darmstadt
- Engineering career
- Discipline: Structural engineer
- Institutions: Dist.M.ASCE, NAE, FIStructE
- Practice name: T. Y. Lin International
- Awards: IStructE Gold Medal; IABSE International Award of Merit in Structural Engineering

Man-Chung Tang Ph.D., P.E., Dist.M.ASCE, NAE, CorrFRSE (Chinese: 鄧文中; pinyin: Dèng Wénzhōng; born 1938) is a Chinese-born American civil engineer and businessman. Tang is chairman of the board and the technical director of T. Y. Lin International, an American design and construction company.

== Biography ==
In 1938, Tang was born in Zhaoqing, Guangdong, China. In 1959, Tang graduated from the Chu Hai College in Hong Kong. In 1965, Tang obtained his doctor of engineering degree from Technical University of Darmstadt (TU Darmstadt).

From 1989 to 1995, Tang was an adjunct professor at the Columbia University Department of Civil Engineering and Engineering Mechanics.

In 1965, Tang joined the Oberhausen GHH in Western Germany. In 1968, Tang worked for the Severud & Associates in New York City, US. In 1978, Tang founded for the DRC – an engineering consultancy company. In 1983, Tang founded the Contech – an engineering consultancy company, too. In 1994, Tang founded the DRC in Chongqing, China, now its China branch of the T.Y.LIN International.

Tang also served as the chairman of the American Society of Civil Engineers (ASCE) committee on Cable-Suspended Bridges. Tang is a former president of the American Segmental Bridge Institute.

== Awards and honors ==
Tang holds honorary professorship at many universities internationally, including Tsinghua University in Beijing, Tongji University in Shanghai, Southeast University in Nanjing, Zhejiang University in Hangzhou, Chongqing Jiaotong University in Chongqing, Dalian Institute of Technology in Dalian.

- Member, United States National Academy of Engineering, elected in 1995;
- Foreign Member, Chinese Academy of Engineering;
- Honorary Fellow, American Society of Civil Engineers, elected in 1995;
- In 1999, Roebling Award;
- In 1998, John A. Roebling Medal for lifetime achievement in bridge engineering;
- In 2010, Outstanding Projects And Leaders (OPAL) Award, from American Society of Civil Engineers.
- In 2010, International Award of Merit in Structural Engineering from IABSE (International Association for Bridge and Structural Engineering)
- In 2013, the Gold Medal of the Institution of Structural Engineers
- In 2018, elected a Corresponding Fellow of the Royal Society of Edinburgh

== List of Tang's projects ==
- Seohae Grand Bridge, South Korea; Lapu Arch Bridge, China;
- San Francisco-Oakland Bay Bridge, Oakland, California;
- Sidney Lanier Bridge, New Brunswick, Georgia;
- Second New Haeng Ju Bridge, South Korea;
- Talmadge Memorial Bridge, Savannah, GA:
- Yangpu Bridge, Shanghai, China:
- Annacis Island Bridge, Vancouver, British Columbia, Canada
- Nanjing Yangtze Bridge, China;
- Humen (Bocca Tigris) Bridge, Guandgdong, China;
- Tagus River Bridge, Lisbon, Portugal;
- Xiamen Harbor Bridge, Xiamen, China:
- Penang Bridge, Malaysia;
- Sunshine Skyway Bridge, St. Petersburg, FL;
- ALRT Fraser River Bridge, Vancouver, British Columbia, Canada;
- Baytown Bridge, Houston TX;
- Denny Creek Bridge, WA;
- Shubenacadie River Bridge, Nova Scotia;
- Knie Bridge, Düsseldorf, Germany;
- Pine Valley Bridge, CA;
- Kipapa Stream Bridge, HI;
- Duisburg Neuenkamp Bridge, Duisburg, Germany;
- East Huntington Bridge, Huntington, WV;
