= Alfred Pugsley =

British structural engineer

Sir Alfred Grenville Pugsley, FRS (13 May 1903 – 7 March 1998) was a British structural engineer.

He was born in Wimbledon and studied engineering at Battersea Polytechnic, followed by working as a civil engineering student at Woolwich Arsenal.

In 1926 he moved to work in R&D at the Royal Airship Works at Cardington, Bedfordshire, where he was involved in the development of the R101 airship. In 1931 he transferred to the Royal Aircraft Establishment (RAE) at Farnborough, where he was concerned with the behaviour of aircraft wings. In 1941 he was made head of the structural and mechanical engineering department at RAE and awarded an OBE in 1944.

After the Second World War he was appointed Professor of Civil Engineering at the University of Bristol becoming Emeritus Professor in 1968. During this time he developed the concepts of safety in engineering, becoming an authority on metal fatigue in aircraft and the safe design of suspension bridges.

He was elected a Fellow of the Royal Society in 1952. and knighted in 1956. In 1957 he was elected President of the Institution of Structural Engineers and in 1968 awarded their Gold Medal "in recognition of his services to the Institution and for originating a general philosophy of structural safety based on a statistical analysis of the probability of failure".

In 1968 his report on the Ronan Point disaster, when a system built tower block in London partly collapsed, caused the building industry to review its techniques and procedures. In 1979 he was presented with the James Alfred Ewing Medal by the Institution of Civil Engineers.

He wrote a number of books based on his work, including:

- Concepts of Safety in Structural Engineering (1951)
- The Theory of Suspension Bridges (1957)
- The Safety of Structures (1966)
- The Works of Isambard Kingdom Brunel (1980)
- The non-linear behaviour of a suspended cable (1983)
