= Mary Irvine (engineer) =

British engineer (1919–2001)

- Born: 19 August 1919; Glasgow
- Died: 12 July 2001 (aged 81)
- Occupation: Engineer

Mary Thompson Irvine (later Lindsay), (19 August 1919 – 12 July 2001) was a British engineer. In 1947, she was the first woman to be elected a chartered member of the Institution of Structural Engineers.

== Early life and education ==
Mary Thompson Irvine was born in Glasgow on 19 August 1919, to Annie (née Clark Anderson) and William Scott Blackwood Irvine. She had on older sister Jessie. William Irvine trained as a draftsman and mechanical engineering apprentice, and the family lived close to the St Rollox Railway Works in Glasgow. It was an industrial, working class, area at the time, and is now the site of Buchanan Street Bus Station.

In 1921, the family moved to Leeds in Yorkshire and Mary was aged 2 when the family settled in the village of Gildersome. This village was home to the works of Robert Hudson Ltd which was founded in the 19th Century and which, by the 1920s, had grown to an international supplier of light railway rolling stock and tipper trucks. The Gildersome works covered a 38-acre site and was a huge local employer. There is no firm evidence that William worked for Hudson, but his employment listing for the 1939 England and Wales Register makes very unlikely that he was working elsewhere: "chief technical engineer light railway rolling stock". Mary Irvine, age 20, was working as a "Junior Draftsman" in the same census.

By 1939, Mary's mother had died and she was living with her father and sister in the comfortable Leeds suburb of Moortown, where they had bought a middle class family home. Initially, Irvine began training as an architect but switched to structural engineering after being inspired by a visit to a steelworks. She studied evening courses at Bradford Technical College and then completed her final studies at the Royal Technical College in Glasgow (now the University of Strathclyde) where her father had also studied.

Irvine took two evening classes in Structures and Structural Design at the Royal Technical College. She was an exceptional student and gained very high grades. Very soon after completing her studies in Glasgow, in July 1947 she sat the exam to become a chartered engineer with the IStructE. At that time it was a two day exam and, of the 171 who sat the test, only 65 passed.

== Career ==
Irvine's long career led her to work in the UK, Southern Rhodesia (now Zimbabwe) and South Africa, from the 1930s to 1985, with a specialism in structural steelwork for commercial and industrial buildings.

In 1947 Mary Irvine became the first woman to be elected a Chartered Member of Institution of Structural Engineers. (The first woman member elected as an Associate Member was Florence Mary Taylor in 1926 and it took until 1954 for Marjem Chatterton to be the first woman elected as a Fellow).

A particularly notable project was her work on the Castle Peak B Power Station in Hong Kong (1982) where she wrote analysis software for the design of plate girders and design checks on coal bunkers for Walkers Pressures. The client for Castle Peak B was Babcock Power with Cleveland Bridge & Engineering Company of Darlington as steelwork contractor. There were several boiler houses, the total weight of each was approximately 9000 tonnes.

During her career she worked for the London County Council, Taylor Woodrow, Southern Rhodesia Railways and Bradshaw Buckton & Tonge of Leeds, establishing a Dundee office for the latter in 1979.

== Personal life ==
In 1953, her engagement was announced to Tom Lindsay, who worked for the South Rhodesian Post Office, the couple having met at the London Highland Club. They married on 11 June 1955 in The Rhul on Sauchiehall Street in Glasgow and after a honeymoon in Europe, initially settled in Bulawayo.
