= Kolbjørn Saether =

Norwegian-American structural engineer

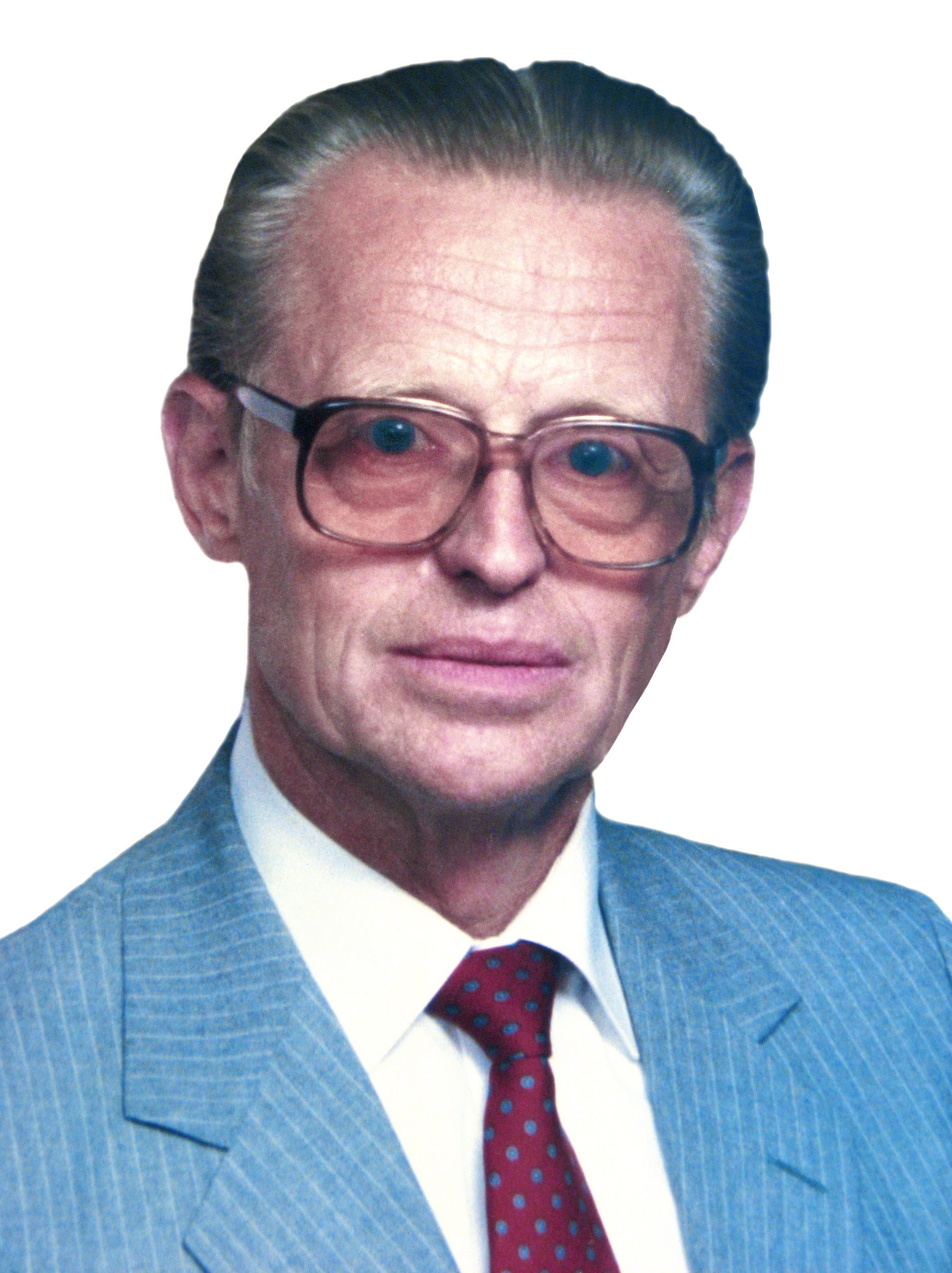
- Born: 16 July 1925; Trondheim, Norway
- Died: 3 May 2007 (aged 81); Chicago, Illinois
- Education: Eidgenössische Technische Hochschule Zürich
- Engineering career
- Discipline: Structural engineering
- Institutions: American Society of Civil Engineers
- Awards: 1991 Lifetime Achievement Award - The Illinois Section of ASCE

Kolbjørn Saether P.E., M.ASCE (July 16, 1925 in Trondheim, Norway – May 3, 2007 in Chicago, IL) was an American structural engineer in the City of Chicago for 47 years. He was a director of the Structural Engineers Association of Illinois and was the organization's president from 1980 to 1981. During his career he developed engineering solutions for skyrise building construction in Chicago, published theoretical insights in structural engineering, and patented novel techniques for building construction.

== Projects ==
=== Huron Plaza ===
Office and apartment building, 30 East Huron Street, Chicago, IL (1983)

==== 1983 PTI Award of Excellence ====
"A unique design resulting in a very slender structure in which the lightness of post-tensioned slabs were blended with an innovative method for reducing lower story moments through the use of outrigger supports."

Huron Plaza is 56-story high-rise with an adjacent 10-story garage located north of downtown Chicago. The structural system is a post-tensioned cast-in-place concrete frame that forms the exterior of the building with exposed architectural concrete columns and spandrel beams.

==== Type of Project ====
The typical floor is 70' X 130' yielding 9,100 square feet for a total of 510,000 square feet for the tower. The garage is 80' X 180' or 14,400 square feet for a total of 144,000 square feet.

==== Special Design Features ====
The design program asked for 8 office floors with a column-free area around a compact center core below 48 apartment floors. Due to the narrow tower, it was necessary to provide three lines of "couple" shear walls to maintain acceptable stiffness. The shear walls, however, could not be permitted within the 8 commercial floors at the lower level of the tower where only the shaft could be accommodated. By modifying the "coupled-shear wall" design, it was possible to determine the effect of the "outriggers," resulting in a moment diagram for the shear wall, center core. These moments were readily handled by the shear wall system. The slabs were designed as a combination of oneway-banded design post-tensioned slabs. The architectural layout did not lend itself to a straight and disciplined column layout. This, however, was overcome by deflecting the banded-tendon runs in the traverse direction laterally to correspond to the column layout. The longitudinal tendons were generally uniformly spaced except where they had to be deflected laterally around slab openings and mechanical obstructions.

==== Advantages of Post-Tensioned Concrete ====
Whereas the selection of post-tensioning was a natural choice for the 10-story parking garage, the decision to use post-tensioned design for the tower was based upon a number of circumstances. The need for a column-free floor plan for the 8 commercial floors at the lower level of the tower, plus the need to place concrete shear walls on the dividing lines between the apartments, pushed the layout toward long-span designs with the typical spans in the order of 27'6". With weight at a premium, only with post-tensioned design was it possible to achieve these spans with a 7" thick slab.

In order to allow casting of two floors each week, three days per floor, a slight upgrading of the concrete design strength was necessary, from fc'=4000 psi to 4600 psi. On the other hand, with improved concrete strength, and relatively low shear stresses, it was possible to show that the post-tensioning greatly reduced the need for shoring and re-shoring, which allowed the finishing work to closely follow the casting of the concrete frame.

The more subtle advantage of post-tensioned construction is the resulting flatness of the slabs, making it easier for the finishing trades to install drywalls, shower bases, bathtubs and tiles, kitchen cabinets, and to align trims and moldings. Also, the crack-free exterior spandrel system is to a great extent to be credited to the compression introduced by the pre-stressing tendons.

=== East Ohio Street ===
400 East Ohio Street, Chicago, IL (1982) 400 East Ohio Street is a 50-story apartment building containing 85 flights of Saether Staircast stairs.

East Ohio was the first building to utilize Saether's invention of the Staircast System.

=== Twin Towers ===
123 SW Jefferson Avenue, Peoria, IL (1984) Twin Towers in Peoria, Illinois is a 28-story condominium and office complex, which used 120 flights of Saether Staircast stairs.

Twin Towers is fairly architecturally unique for Peoria. The condominium towers contain upper-class living space.

=== The New York ===
3660 North Lake Shore Drive, Chicago, IL (1986) The 48-story New York Private Residences is located in Chicago's Lakeview area.

The New York is the world's tallest masonry building.

== Patents ==
Kolbjørn Saether generated numerous patents to provide cost saving solutions to various aspects of high-rise building construction. A sample of some of his more influential innovations are listed below.

=== The Saether Staircast System ===
The Saether Staircast System is a system for erecting precast stairs in high-rise construction.

A launching truss consisting of individual, adjustable rigid steel frames interconnected to the precast stair flights, holds the stairs above the floor being constructed.

As the adjustable shores leapfrog upward, their load-bearing capacity is replaced as needed by standard shores, while the newly placed stair-run is supported at the top of the truss.

The stairs are adjustable to within 1/16 inch by manually activating screw-jacks at the top of the launching truss.

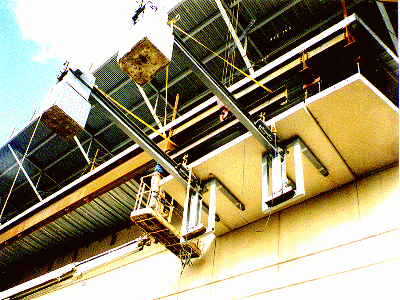

=== Sky-Fork System ===
As shown, double Sky-Forks with seven-ton capacity are suspended in perfect equilibrium from a single crane hook.

The sky-fork material handling system provides the contractor with a tool for projects where the building frame is cantilevered out at various levels.

The system is an ideal tool for re-habbing existing buildings where material must be loaded laterally into an existing building frame.

=== Multi-Level Component System ===
The multi-leveling component system (MLCS), an upgraded lift-slab method that uniquely allows all slabs of a building to be raised in one smooth operation.

Conventional lift-slab systems consist of flat-plate floors reinforced with either post-tensioned steel or mild steel reinforcing bars.

Floors are cast at ground level one on top of the other, then raised a few at a time.

Each is secured to the columns of the structure at their respective levels.

The MLCS method departs from this by raising the entire stack of concrete floor slabs in one smooth operation.

=== Roof Lifting ===
When existing warehouses and shops no longer have adequate headroom, the Saether approach of lifting the roof can be used for less cost than new construction. The lifting is done in large units. All mechanical and electrical equipment hung from or supported on the roof is included in the lift. Where vertical runs are involved, they are cut and later rejoined. Swivel joints may be provided where continuous service is required.

== Awards ==
Kolbjørn Saether was widely regarded in the Chicago building community as a major contributor to the engineering of important projects in the Chicago area. Of the accolades he received from the City and his peers, a sampling of some of his most important awards includes the following citations:

- 1998 SEAOI Excellence in Structural Engineering Awards Competition Winner: Meritorious Publication Award Kolbjorn Saether for "Flat Plates with Regular and Irregular Column Layouts"
- 1991 Lifetime Achievement Award, presented by the Illinois Section Structural Division of the American Society of Civil Engineers.
- 1991 John F. Parmer Award Kolbjorn Saether, SEAOI Best Structure Award for design of the "New York" high-rise building in Chicago.

== Publications and Reports ==
Kolbjørn Saether produced a number of refereed technical journal publications together with numerous reports on specific projects he worked on. Some of the most pertinent publications and reports are presented, particularly regarding specific theoretical issues arising in the structural engineering of high-rise structures.

=== Technical Journals and Magazines ===
Saether, K., "The Structural Membrane", J. American Concrete Institute, 32(7), pp. 827–850, 1961.

Saether, K. "Thin Shells for Free-Form Plans", Progressive Architecture, 1963.

Saether, K., "Direct Design of Prestressed Concrete Members", ACI, 60, pp. 239–260, 1963.

Saether, K., Beck, C.F. and Sandberg, H.R., "Reliability of Computer-Aided Design", J. Tech. Councils ASCE, 105, pp. 371–384, 1979.

Saether, K., "Precast Stairs Speed Concrete Building Construction", 1984,

Saether, K., "Prestressed Concrete in High-Rise Construction", ACI, 97, pp. 159–198, 1987.

Saether, K., "Flat Plates with Regular and Irregular Column Layouts. I Analysis & II Numerical Evaluations", J. struct. Engrg. 120(5), pp. 1563–1598, 1994.

Saether, K., "Structural membrane shells", International Association for Shells and Special Structures. International Symposium, Milan, Italy, 1995.

Saether, K., "Concern over computer-aided engineering", SEAOI Bulletin, March 2001

Saether, K., "Lift slab made practical", 1971

=== Reports ===
Saether, K., "A Novel Method for Terra Cotta Repair"

Saether, K,. "Structural Membrane Approach for the Design of Shells"

Saether, K., "Column Supported, Irregular Flat Plates with Surface Oriented Moment Distribution"

Saether, K. and Saether, E., "A Nonlinear Analysis of Reinforced Concrete Slabs Accounting for Both Inelastic Fracture and Plastic Yielding"
