= Jo da Silva =

Engineer

Dame Jo da Silva DBE FREng FICE RDI
- Born: Joanna Gabrielle da Silva; 1967 (age 58–59)
- Education: University of Cambridge (BA, MA)
- Employer: Arup Group
- Awards: Doctor of Technology (2014); Gold Medal of the Institution of Structural Engineers (2017)

Dame Joanna Gabrielle da Silva (born 1967) is the Global Director of Sustainable Development at Arup Group.

== Early life and education ==
Da Silva was born in Washington, D.C. to John Burke da Silva CMG and Jennifer Jane da Silva. She studied engineering at the University of Cambridge where she was a student at Trinity College, Cambridge. She graduated in 1988 and then travelled, seeing the roles of engineers first-hand. She worked in central India on emergency management.

== Career ==
Da Silva joined Arup Group as a graduate engineer in 1989. She was part of the development of the Hong Kong International Airport and National Portrait Gallery, London. She began to work in post-disaster engineering in 1991. In 2001, she was selected as one of Management Today's 35 Women Under 35. She has investigated the relationship between populations and the built environment, in particular the role of infrastructure in reducing vulnerability.

In 2009, da Silva founded the Arup International Development group, a non-profit subsidiary of Arup Group which works with organisations that look to improve the coordination of infrastructure development in the developing world. She is a member of RedR, Engineers for Disaster Relief, a charity which has thousands of engineers who will respond quickly after a disaster. Arup encourage humanitarian efforts to build back better, preventing homes being destroyed when floods or disasters return.

Da Silva is a specialist in disaster reduction and has worked with various humanitarian groups. She worked with the United Nations High Commissioner for Refugees (UNHCR) in Sri Lanka after the 2004 Indian Ocean earthquake and tsunami. She coordinated the efforts of over 100 humanitarian agencies and the building of over 60,000 shelters in six months. From 2008 to 2017, she worked with Sabre Education to develop a series of early-years learning facilities in Ghana. The work was supported by the Institution of Civil Engineers. She has since been working with the World Bank on a Global Program for Safer Schools. Da Silva worked with Tower Hamlets Council on Ideas Stores, a way to bring IT facilities to communities in East London.

== Awards and honours ==
Da Silva was elected as Fellow of the Royal Academy of Engineering (FREng) in 2009.

She was appointed Officer of the Order of the British Empire (OBE) in 2011 for services to engineering and humanitarian relief and Dame Commander of the Order of the British Empire (DBE) in the 2021 New Year Honours for services to engineering and international, sustainable development.

In 2012, she became the first woman to deliver the Institution of Civil Engineers Brunel International Lecture, discussing the role of engineers in responding to disaster. She was awarded an Honorary Doctor of Technology (DTech) degree from Coventry University in 2014. She was featured in a 2015 Queen Elizabeth Prize for Engineering and 2016 Victoria and Albert Museum campaigns describing her career in engineering.

She is founder and on the Board of the Lloyd's Register and Arup-supported global programme to accelerate critical infrastructure resilience, "The Resilience Shift", which stimulates improved resilience and whole-system thinking through thought leadership, grant making, and convening.

Da Silva was awarded the Gold Medal of the Institution of Structural Engineers in 2017 for her work in urban resilience. She delivered her Gold Medal lecture at Trinity College Dublin in 2018, talking about Design, Disaster and Development.

She delivered the 2018 Judith Neilson Lecture at the University of New South Wales.

In 2021, Da Silva was named a Dame for her work within disaster relief and sustainability in locations such as Haiti and Sri Lanka.

In November 2021 she was recognised as a Royal Designer for Industry for her sustainable design.

== Media ==
In November 2021 Da Silva was the guest on the long running BBC Radio 4 programme Desert Island Discs.
