= Jack Zunz =

British civil engineer

Sir Jack Zunz FREng FIStructE FICE
- Born: Gerhard Jacob Zunz; 25 December 1923; Mönchengladbach, Germany
- Died: 11 December 2018 (aged 94); United Kingdom
- Spouse: Babs Maisel
- Children: 3
- Engineering career
- Discipline: Civil engineer
- Institutions: Fellow Royal Academy of Engineering; Fellow Institution of Civil Engineers; Fellow Institution of Structural Engineers
- Practice name: Ove Arup & Partners (Former Chairman)
- Projects: Sydney Opera House
- Awards: IStructE Gold Medal; Hon. D.Eng (Glasgow University); Hon. D.Sc (University of Western Ontario); Hon. Fellow Royal Institute of British Architects; FREng

Sir Gerhard Jacob Zunz (25 December 1923 – 11 December 2018) was a British civil engineer and former chairman of Ove Arup & Partners. He was the principal structural designer of the Sydney Opera House.

== Career ==
Zunz was born to a Jewish family 25 December 1923 in Mönchengladbach, Germany, but at the age of 13 he moved to South Africa. After interrupting his studies to serve with the South African Army in Egypt and Italy in the Second World War, he graduated in civil engineering at the University of the Witwatersrand, Johannesburg in 1948. He worked for a consultant and structural steelwork fabricator, before coming to London to join Ove Arup in 1950. In 1954, he returned to South Africa and together with Michael Lewis established an office for Arup.

In 1961 Zunz returned to London as an associate partner and then from 1965 as a senior partner. He led the team which designed the roof of the Sydney Opera House. He was responsible for many landmark projects, including Britannic House for BP, the Standard Bank building in Johannesburg, the Emley Moor transmitting station, the headquarters building for the HSBC Main Building, the first Stansted Airport Terminal and many more.

He was Chairman of Ove Arup and Partners from 1977 to 1984 and co-chairman of Ove Arup Partnership, the whole Arup group, from 1984 to 1989. He was centrally involved in developing the technical skills of the firm, in increasing its geographical spread as well as creating a framework for an increasing number of talented engineers and allied professionals to develop their skills and their careers. Zunz was a consultant to Arup from 1989 to 1996 and the first Chairman of the Ove Arup Foundation. Under his guidance the Foundation initiated the Interdisciplinary Design for the Built Environment postgraduate programme at the University of Cambridge, and subsequently the LSE Cities Programme at the London School of Economics.

He was a Fellow Commoner at Churchill College, Cambridge (1967–68). He has lectured widely on his projects and related topics, particularly education. He is the author or co author of many papers. He held a number of appointments outside his firm including being Chairman of the Trustees of the Architectural Association and President of CIRIA (Construction Industry Research and Information Association).

== Awards ==
He was elected a Fellow of the Royal Academy of Engineering in 1983. Together with Sir Ove Arup he was given the Silver Medal of the Institution of Structural Engineers and he received that Institution's Gold Medal in 1988.

He was appointed Knight Bachelor in 1989. He received an Honorary Doctorate of Science from the University of Western Ontario in 1993, an Honorary Doctorate of Engineering from the University of Glasgow in 1994 and an Honorary Doctorate of Science in engineering from the University of the Witwatersrand in 2015. He was made an Honorary Fellow of the Royal Institute of British Architects in 1990 and an Honorary Fellow of Trevelyan College, Durham University in 1996.

== Personal life ==
Zunz died on 11 December 2018, at 94.

== Bibliography ==
- Campbell, Peter; Allan, John; Ahrends, Peter; Zunz, Jack; Morreau, Patrick (1995). Ove Arup 1895-1988. London: Institution of Civil Engineers. ISBN 0-7277-2066-X.
