= International Award of Merit in Structural Engineering =

Engineering award

The International Award of Merit in Structural Engineering is presented to people for outstanding contributions in the field of structural engineering, with special reference to usefulness for society by the International Association for Bridge and Structural Engineering

Fields of endeavour may include: planning, design, construction, materials, equipment, education, research, government, management. The first Award was presented in 1976.

== Awardees ==
Source IABSE

- 2025: Jacques Combault, France
- 2024: Klaus Ostenfeld, Denmark
- 2023: Tom Vrouwenvelder, The Netherlands
- 2022: Yozo Fujino, Japan
- 2021: Jürg Conzett, Switzerland
- 2020: Ahseen Kareem, USA
- 2019: Niels Jørgen Gimsing, Denmark
- 2018: Tristram Carfrae, UK
- 2017: Juan José Arenas, Spain
- 2016: no award
- 2015: Jose Calavera, Spain
- 2014: William F. Baker, USA
- 2013: Theodossios Tassios, Greece
- 2012: Hai-Fan Xiang, China
- 2011: Leslie E. Robertson, USA
- 2010: Man-Chung Tang, USA
- 2009: Christian Menn, Switzerland
- 2008: Tom Paulay, New Zealand
- 2007: Manabu Ito, Japan and Spain
- 2006: Javier Manterola, Spain
- 2005: Jean-Marie Cremer, Belgium
- 2004: Chander Alimchandani, India
- 2003: Michel Virlogeux, France
- 2002: Ian Liddell, UK
- 2001: John W. Fisher, USA
- 2000: John E. Breen, USA
- 1998: Peter Head, UK
- 1997: Bruno Thürlimann, Switzerland
- 1996: Alan G. Davenport, Canada
- 1994: T. N. Subbarao, India
- 1995: Mamoru Kawaguchi, Japan
- 1993: Jean Muller, France
- 1992: Leo Finzi, Italy
- 1991: Jörg Schlaich, Germany

== See also ==
- List of engineering awards
