= Charles Husband =

British civil and consulting engineer

Sir Henry Charles Husband (30 October 1908 – 7 October 1983), often known as H. C. Husband, was a leading British civil and consulting engineer from Sheffield, England, who designed bridges and other major civil engineering works. He is particularly known for his work on the Jodrell Bank radio telescopes; the first of these was the largest fully steerable radio telescope in the world on its completion in 1957. Other projects he was involved in designing include the Goonhilly Satellite Earth Station's aerials, one of the earliest telecobalt radiotherapy units, Sri Lanka's tallest building, and the rebuilding of Robert Stephenson's Britannia Bridge after a fire. He won the Royal Society's Royal Medal and the Wilhelm Exner Medal.

== Early life and education ==
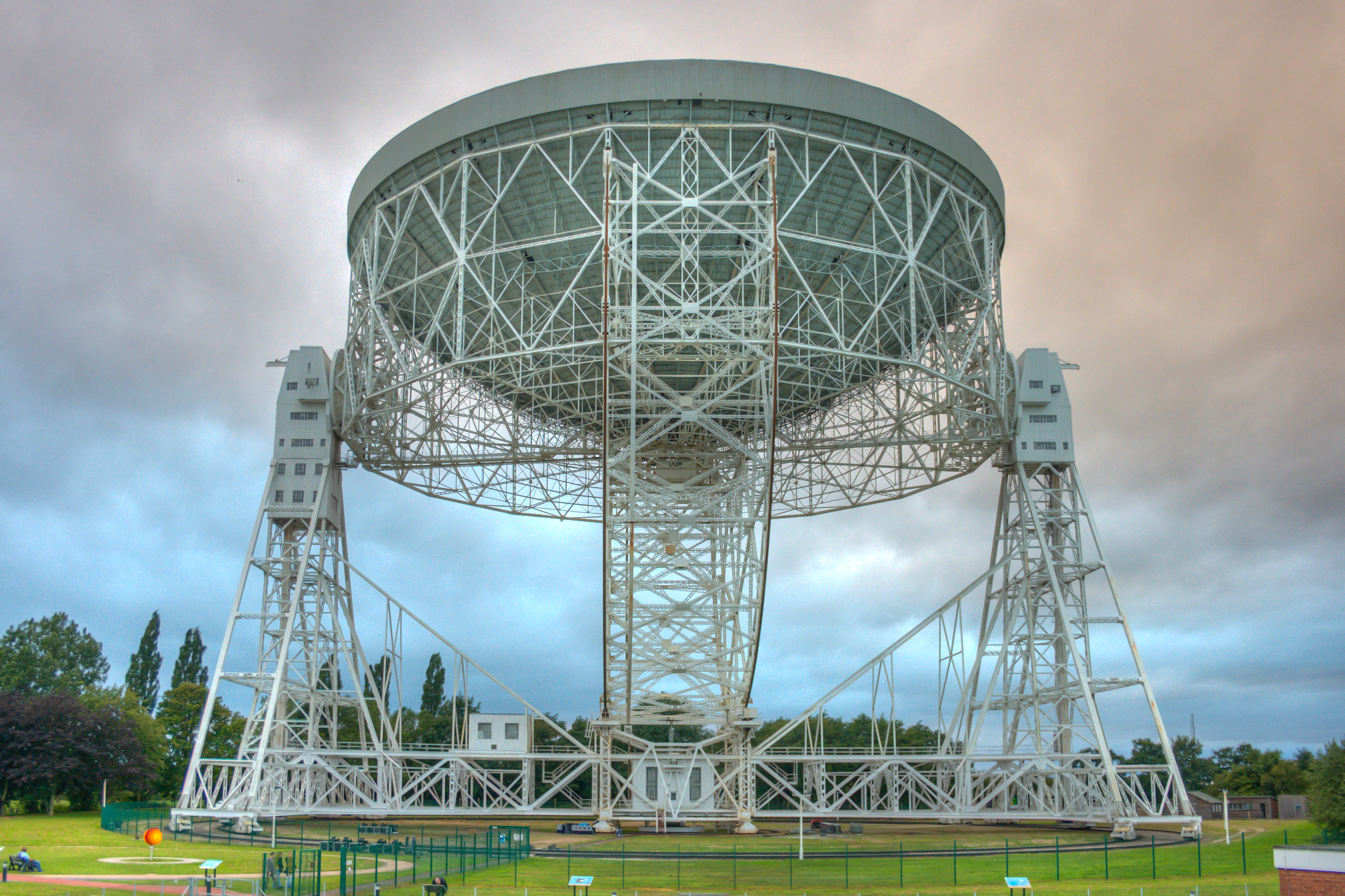
Lovell radio telescope at Jodrell Bank

Husband was born in Sheffield in 1908 to Ellen Walton Husband, née Harby, and her husband, Joseph (1871–1961), a civil engineer who had founded Sheffield Technical School's civil engineering department and subsequently served as the University of Sheffield's initial professor in the discipline. Charles Husband attended the city's King Edward VII School and gained an engineering degree at Sheffield University in 1929.

== Career ==
His first job was with Barnsley Corporation Waterworks. He then worked under the civil engineer Sir Owen Williams in 1931–33, before spending three years on various major English and Scottish residential projects with the First National Housing Trust. In 1936, with Joseph Husband and Antony Clark, he founded the consulting engineering firm of Husband and Clark (later Husband & Co.) in Sheffield. During the Second World War, he first worked in the Ministry of Labour and National Service and later on aircraft manufacture for the Ministry of Works. After the war, Husband headed the engineering consultancy, successfully expanding their business, with clients in the immediate post-war years including the British Iron and Steel Research Association, National Coal Board and the Production Engineering Research Association.

=== Radio telescopes ===
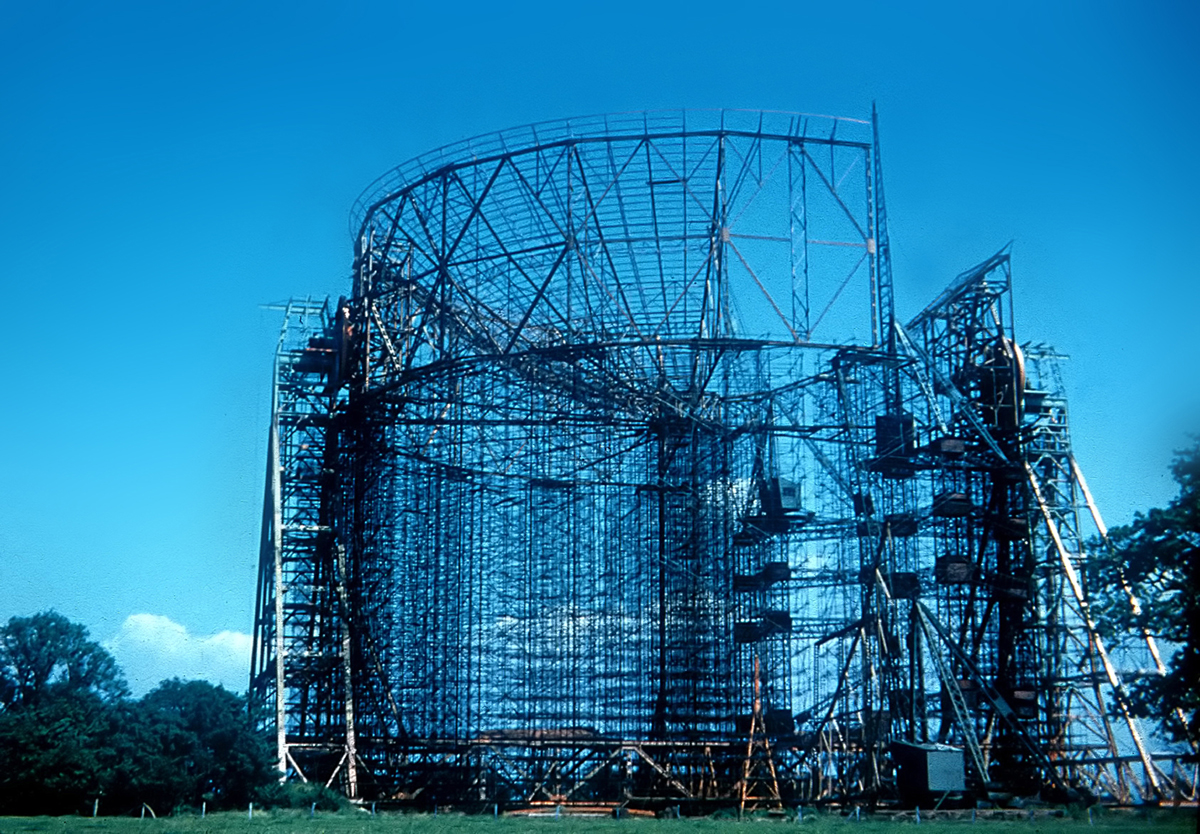
Construction of the 250-ft telescope

Husband worked with Bernard Lovell – the founder of the Jodrell Bank Observatory near Holmes Chapel in Cheshire – on the design and construction of the observatory's first large steerable radio telescope, the "250-ft telescope" (now known as the Lovell Telescope). After attempting to adapt military radar equipment to detect cosmic rays shortly after the Second World War, Lovell had realised that a much larger aerial would be required, and constructed a 66-metre diameter dish, limited by being static, before proposing the development of an even larger steerable telescope. The idea posed such formidable engineering challenges that the project had been declared "impossible" by other engineers, but Husband is reported to have concluded at their first meeting in September 1949, "It should be easy—about the same problem as throwing a swing bridge over the Thames at Westminster."

He began work on the project early the following year, creating the initial drawings in January 1950 and detailed plans just over a year later. He and Lovell selected a dish diameter of 250 feet (76 metres). Construction began in 1952; despite Husband's optimism the project was beset with delays and escalating costs, caused by multiple changes to Lovell's specifications and the rising price of steel, among other factors. Wind-tunnel studies with a scale model played an important role in the final design. The telescope was eventually completed in 1957, when it was the largest fully steerable radio telescope in the world. It remains in service as of 2026. According to Lovell, the project was completed using "a desk calculator and slide rule", which led to a "sturdy" construction with "quite a lot of redundancy in the steelwork" which Lovell later credited for the telescope's longevity. The structure is a rare example of a post-war grade-I-listed structure, denoting its "exceptional interest", and was voted Britain's top "unsung landmark" in a 2006 BBC poll.

Husband also helped to design the steerable radio aerials at the GPO's Goonhilly Satellite Earth Station in Cornwall, as well as radio telescopes in the UK and elsewhere.

=== Other projects ===
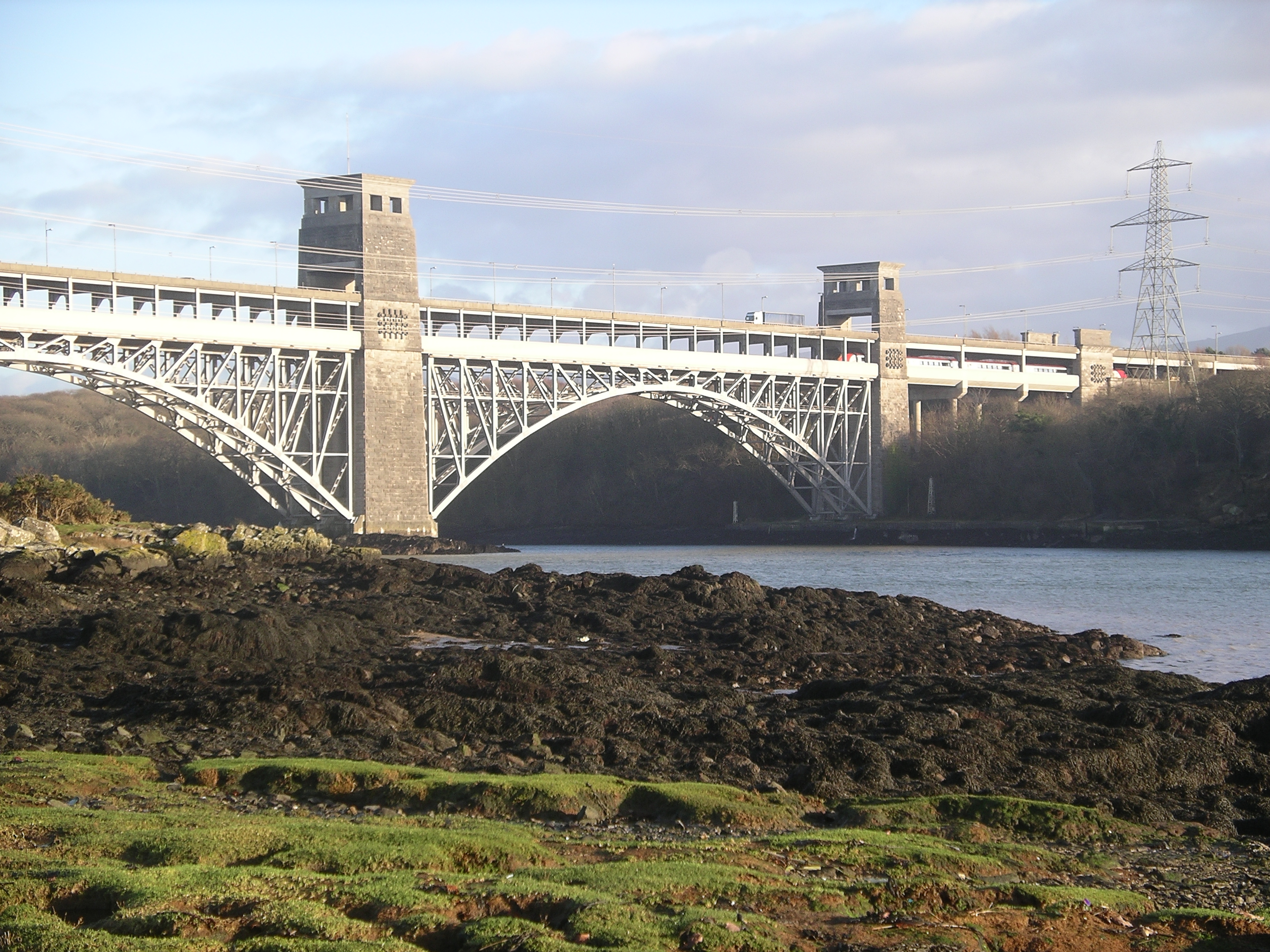
Britannia Bridge after rebuilding

Other innovative projects Husband & Co. undertook under Husband's leadership included designing a facility for testing jet engines at altitude in 1946. In the 1950s, Husband assisted the radiologist Frank Ellis in designing one of the earliest telecobalt radiotherapy units, for radiation treatment of cancer, which was installed at the Churchill Hospital in Oxford. Like the radio telescopes, the engineering problem involved moving a heavy weight, in this case the lead-shielded source, in three dimensions.

He designed many road and rail bridges. Husband was awarded the contract to rebuild the Britannia Bridge over the Menai Strait in Wales, after a 1970 fire. The original was an 1850 rail bridge by Robert Stephenson, and Husband faced criticism for designing a double-tier bridge including an additional road deck, which he stated formed part of Stephenson's original concept. The firm also designed the bridge used in the 1957 film, The Bridge on the River Kwai.

Outside the UK, Husband & Co. had an office in Colombo and undertook multiple projects in Sri Lanka. Husband was the architect of the Ceylon Insurance Building in Colombo, Sri Lanka (later Ceylinco House), a 16-storey building equipped with a helicopter landing pad on its roof. On completion in 1960, it was the tallest structure in Sri Lanka, at nearly 55 metres.

== Awards, honours and societies ==
Husband was recognised with the CBE in 1964. He won the Royal Medal of the Royal Society in 1965 for "his distinguished work in many aspects of engineering, particularly for his design studies of large structures such as those exemplified in the radio telescope at Jodrell Bank and Goonhilly Downs"; he was the medal's first recipient in the applied sciences. He was also awarded the Wilhelm Exner Medal of the Österreichischer Gewerbeverein (1966), the Gold Medal of the Institution of Structural Engineers (1973), and the Benjamin Baker Gold Medal (1959) and James Watt medal (1976) of the Institution of Civil Engineers. He received honorary degrees from the universities of Manchester (1964) and Sheffield (1967). He was knighted in 1975.

He served as president of the Institution of Structural Engineers (1964–65), chaired the Association of Consulting Engineers (1967) and served on the board of the Council of Engineering Institutions from 1979 until his death. He also chaired Sheffield University's engineering and metallurgy advisory committee (1962–65) and served on Bradford Institute of Technology's civil engineering advisory board (1962–68). In addition to the Institution of Structural Engineers, he was an elected fellow of the American Society of Civil Engineers, Institution of Civil Engineers and the Institution of Mechanical Engineers, and was among the founding members of the Fellowship of Engineering.

== Personal life ==
In 1932, Husband married Eileen Margaret Nowill (1906-2000), an architect's daughter who was also from Sheffield. The couple had four children, with the elder of their two sons, Richard Husband, also becoming a civil engineer. He retired in 1982. Husband died in 1983 at Nether Padley, just outside Sheffield in Derbyshire.

== Selected publications ==
- H. C. Husband, R. W. Husband (1975). Reconstruction of the Britannia Bridge. Proceedings of the Institution of Civil Engineers 58: 25–49
- Henry Charles Husband (1958). The Jodrell Bank Radio Telescope. Proceedings of the Institution of Civil Engineers 9: 65–86

== See also ==
- Mott MacDonald, into which Husband & Co. merged in 1990
