= John Baker, Baron Baker =

British scientist and structural engineer

John Fleetwood Baker
- Born: 19 March 1901; Liscard, Cheshire, United Kingdom
- Died: 9 September 1985 (aged 84); Cambridge, Cambridgeshire, United Kingdom
- Education: Rossall School Clare College, Cambridge
- Spouse: Fiona Mary MacAlister Walker
- Children: Joanna and Dinah
- Parent(s): J. W. Baker, Emily Fleetwood
- Engineering career
- Discipline: Structural engineer
- Institutions: Institution of Structural Engineers
- Projects: Baker Building, Cambridge University Engineering Department
- Significant design: Morrison shelter
- Significant advance: Plastic theory of structural analysis
- Awards: IStructE Gold Medal; OBE; Fellow of the Royal Society

John Fleetwood Baker, Baron Baker, FRS, (19 March 1901 – 9 September 1985) was a British scientist and structural engineer.

== Early life ==
Baker was born in Liscard, Cheshire, a son of J. W. Baker and Emily Fleetwood. He was educated at Rossall School and was admitted to Clare College, Cambridge in 1919 on a mathematics scholarship. He married Fiona Mary MacAlister Walker (1903-1979) in 1928.

== Career ==
After graduation, in 1923, Baker worked with the Air Ministry on structural problems of airships under Alfred Pippard. At 28, in 1929, he contracted tuberculosis. Upon recovering, he became a technical officer with the Structural Steel Research Committee, which was investigating why measured stresses in structural steel bore little resemblance to theoretical ones. During his time in this post, he developed the plastic theory of design, a revolutionary method of design of steel structures which gives a lower bound on the collapse load, and is hence always safe. Until then, all design of steel structures was based on elastic theory of design. In 1932 he was awarded the Telford Gold Medal of the Institution of Civil Engineers for the work.

In 1933 Baker became Professor of Engineering at Bristol University, after which he was scientific adviser to the Design and Development Section of the Ministry of Home Security from 1939 to 1943. In this time he created the Morrison indoor shelter, using his plastic theory of structural analysis. Baker was appointed an Officer of the Order of the British Empire (OBE) in the 1941 Birthday Honours.

From 1943 to 1968, he was Professor of Mechanical Sciences and Head of Department at Cambridge University Engineering Department. During this time the department more than tripled in size, from 24 lecturers to 111. He used the structure of the Forth rail bridge as the basis of explanations of structural design theory to his students. During his time at Cambridge, plasticity theory was used to design the new Baker Building of the department, making it the first building in the world designed by this method.

In 1956 Baker was elected a Fellow of the Royal Society and awarded their Royal Medal in 1970. In the 1961 Birthday Honours he received a knighthood, having the honour conferred by HM The Queen on 5 July 1961.

In 1963 he became an honorary graduate as Doctor of Science at the University of Edinburgh. He was created a life peer as Baron Baker, of Windrush in the County of Gloucestershire on 1 February 1977.

== Plasticity theory of design ==
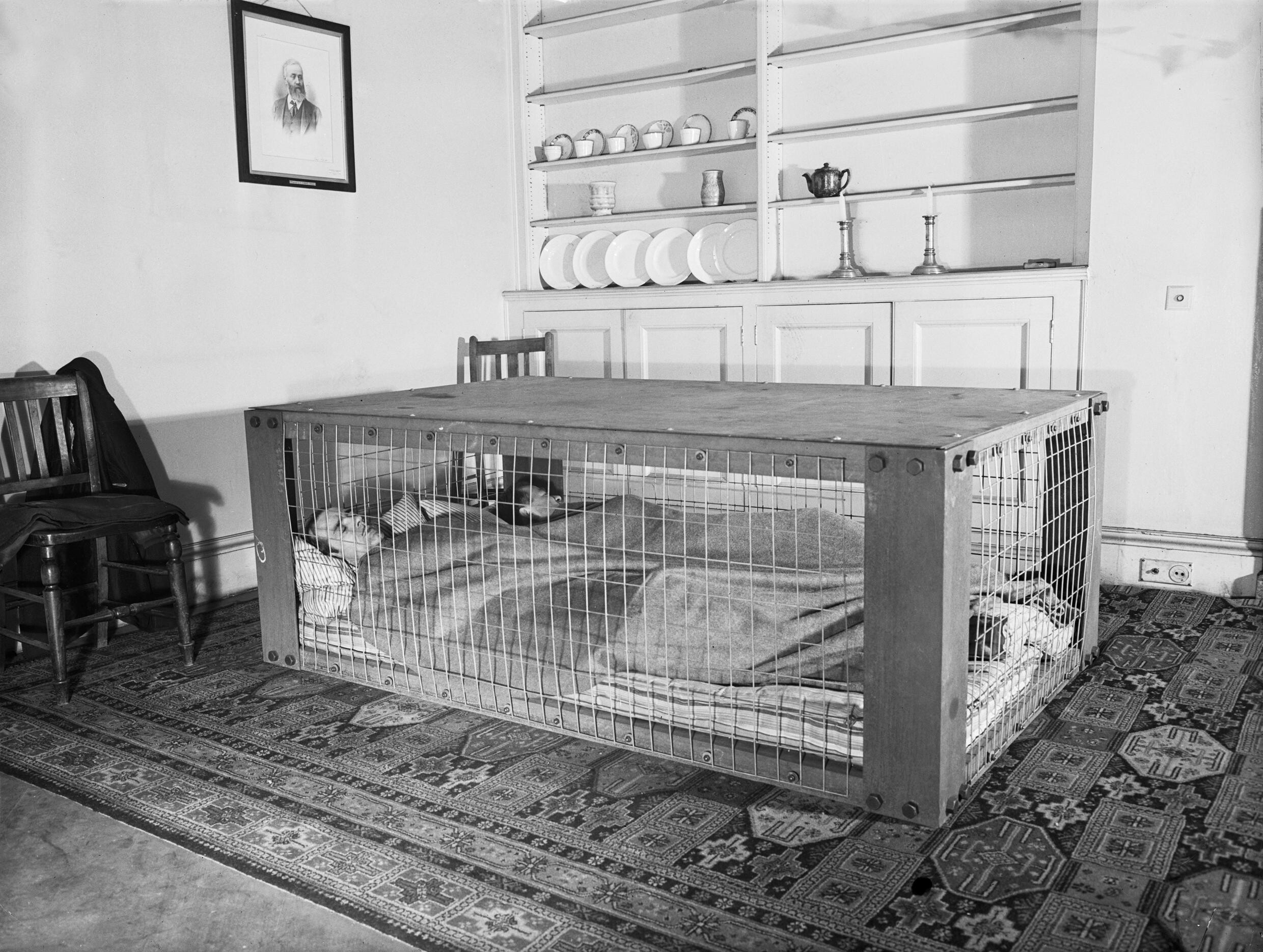
A couple demonstrating the use of a Morrison shelter

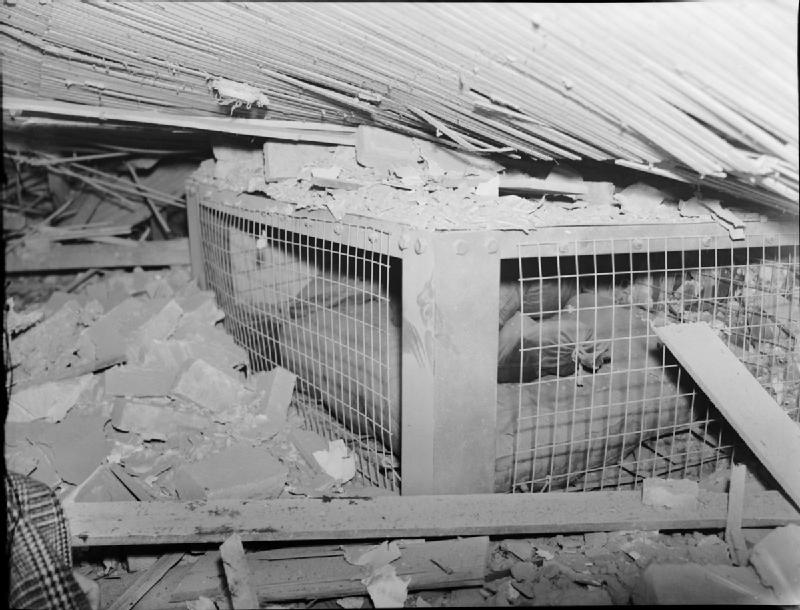
A Morrison shelter containing a dummy, after the house it was in had been destroyed as a test

Steel can either behave elastically or plastically. Elastic deformation is reversible, and with the removal of load the material will return to its original shape, position and stress distribution. Plastic deformation is not reversible, and with the removal of load the material will assume a different shape, position and stress distribution to the one it held originally.

Plasticity theory is based on plastic behaviour, and calculates a lower bound on the load that a structure can carry (the load at which it collapses will not be lower than that calculated). This allows a structure to be designed so it will always be able to carry the chosen magnitude of load, even if the exact way it does so is not understood.

Elasticity theory depends on guessing the way in which a structure works, and the loads it will be subjected to, and designing it to carry those loads in the assumed manner. This ensures it is safe if the structure is well understood, but it may not be safe if the structure carries the loads in a different manner. Therefore, it gives an upper bound on the collapse load (the load at which it collapses will not be higher than that calculated). Elastic design is sensitive to deformation of the structure, and only works for small deflections.

During the 1950s Baker and W. Prager of Brown University published a two volume account of the history of steel structures, with plastic theory integral to it. By the 1960s it was being taught in the undergraduate engineering course at Cambridge University, and Baker presented an undergraduate lecture on the principles of design of the Morrison shelter as an interesting introduction to his theory of plastic design of structures; in 1968 this lecture was attended by Prince Charles, and it can be summarised as follows:

It was impractical to produce a design for mass production that could withstand a direct hit, and so it was a matter of selecting a suitable design target that would save lives in many cases of blast damage to bombed houses. Examination of bombed buildings indicated that in many instances, one end wall of a house was sucked or blown out by a nearby blast, and the floor of the first storey pivoted about its other end (supported by a largely intact wall) and killed the inhabitants. The Morrison shelter was therefore designed to be able to withstand the upper floor falling, of a typical two-storey-house undergoing a partial collapse. The shelter was designed to absorb this energy by plastic deformation, since this can absorb two or three orders of magnitude more energy than elastic deformation. Its design enabled the family to sleep under the shelter at night or during raids, and to use it as a dining table in the daytime, making it a practical item in the house.

.

== Works ==
- A distribution method of stress analysis (Reports and memoranda) (1935)
- The Analysis of Engineering Structures Alfred John Sutton Pippard, John Fleetwood Baker. 1st Edition 1937, many subsequent editions
- The Plastic Design of Frames Jacques Heyman, John Baker, C.U.P. 1969
- Enterprise versus Bureaucracy : The Development of Structural Air-Raid Precautions during the 2nd World War (1978)
- "The Steel Skeleton" vols 1 and 2
