= Oleg Kerensky =

Russian civil engineer (1905–1984)

- Born: 16 April 1905; St. Petersburg, Russia
- Died: 25 June 1984 (aged 79); London, England
- Occupation: Engineer
- Children: 1
- Parent: Alexander Kerensky

Oleg Alexander Kerensky CBE FRS (Russian: Оле́г Алекса́ндрович Ке́ренский; 16 April 1905 – 25 June 1984) was a Russian-British civil engineer, one of the foremost bridge designers of his time.

== Life ==
Kerensky was born in Saint Petersburg, Russia, the son of future Russian prime minister Alexander Kerensky, who survived the events of the Russian Civil War and emigrated to Paris in 1918. Both Oleg and his younger brother Gleb graduated as engineers in 1927, and both settled in the United Kingdom.

As an associate of Dorman Long, Kerensky assisted on the landmark 1932 Sydney Harbour Bridge. As an associate, and then a partner, in the firm Freeman Fox & Partners, Kerensky designed many British road bridges and structures such as the 1951 temporary Dome of Discovery in London, the largest dome in the world, and was supervising engineer on the Erskine Bridge. He was president of the Institution of Structural Engineers in 1970–71 and won their gold medal in 1977. After his death in London, the same institution began their Kerensky Memorial Conferences beginning in 1988.

He was made a CBE in 1964 and was elected a Fellow of the Royal Society in 1970.

Kerensky was the father and namesake of dance critic Oleg Kerensky Jr. (1930–1993), who appeared in the 1981 film Reds as his grandfather when he was the head of the Russian Provisional Government.
