= Structural engineer =

Designer, researcher and planner of buildings and similar objects

Occupation
- Names: Structural engineer, professional engineer, chartered engineer
- Occupation type: Profession
- Activity sectors: Engineering

Description
- Competencies: Design, analysis, critical thinking, engineering ethics, project management, engineering economics, creativity, problem solving
- Related jobs: Civil engineer, architect, project manager

Structural engineers analyze, design, plan, and research structural components and structural systems to achieve design goals and ensure the safety and comfort of users or occupants. Their work takes account mainly of safety, technical, economic, and environmental concerns, but they may also consider aesthetic and social factors.

Structural engineering is usually considered a specialty discipline within civil engineering, but it can also be studied in its own right. In the United States, most practicing structural engineers are currently licensed as civil engineers, but the situation varies from state to state. Some states have a separate license for structural engineers who are required to design special or high-risk structures such as schools, hospitals, or skyscrapers. In the United Kingdom, most structural engineers in the building industry are members of the Institution of Structural Engineers or the Institution of Civil Engineers.

Typical structures designed by a structural engineer include buildings, towers, stadiums, and bridges. Other structures such as oil rigs, space satellites, aircraft, and ships may also be designed by a structural engineer. Most structural engineers are employed in the construction industry, however, there are also structural engineers in the aerospace, automobile, and shipbuilding industries. In the construction industry, they work closely with architects, civil engineers, mechanical engineers, electrical engineers, quantity surveyors, and construction managers.

Structural engineers ensure that buildings and bridges are built to be strong enough and stable enough to resist all appropriate structural loads (e.g., gravity, wind, snow, rain, seismic (earthquake), earth pressure, temperature, and traffic) to prevent or reduce the loss of life or injury. They also design structures to be stiff enough to not deflect or vibrate beyond acceptable limits. Human comfort is an issue that is regularly considered limited. Fatigue is also an important consideration for bridges and aircraft design or for other structures that experience many stress cycles over their lifetimes. Consideration is also given to the durability of materials against possible deterioration which may impair performance over the design lifetime.

== Education ==
The education of structural engineers is usually through a civil engineering bachelor's degree, and often a master's degree specializing in structural engineering. The fundamental core subjects for structural engineering are strength of materials or solid mechanics, structural analysis (static and dynamic), material science and numerical analysis. Reinforced concrete, composite structure, timber, masonry and structural steel designs are the general structural design courses that will be introduced in the next level of the education of structural engineering. The structural analysis courses which include structural mechanics, structural dynamics and structural failure analysis are designed to build up the fundamental analysis skills and theories for structural engineering students. At the senior year level or in graduate programs, prestressed concrete design, space frame design for building and aircraft, bridge engineering, civil and aerospace structure rehabilitation and other advanced structural engineering specializations are usually introduced.

Recently in the United States, there have been discussions in the structural engineering community about the knowledge base of structural engineering graduates. Some have called for a master's degree to be the minimum standard for professional licensing as a civil engineer. There are separate structural engineering undergraduate degrees at the University of California, San Diego and the University of Architecture, Civil Engineering, and Geodesy, Sofia, Bulgaria. Many students who later become structural engineers major in civil, mechanical, or aerospace engineering degree programs, with an emphasis on structural engineering. Architectural engineering programs do offer structural emphases and are often in combined academic departments with civil engineering.

== Licensing or chartered status ==
In many countries, structural engineering is a profession subject to licensure. Licensed engineers may receive the title of Professional Engineer, Chartered Engineer, Structural Engineer, or other title depending on the jurisdiction. The process to attain licensure to work as a structural engineer varies by location, but typically specifies university education, work experience, examination, and continuing education to maintain their mastery of the subject. Professional Engineers bear legal responsibility for their work to ensure the safety and performance of their structures and only practice within the scope of their expertise.

In the United States, persons practicing structural engineering must be licensed in each state in which they practice. Licensure to practice as a structural engineer usually be obtained by the same qualifications as for a Civil Engineer, but some states require licensure specifically for structural engineering, with experience specific and non-concurrent with experience claimed for another engineering profession. The qualifications for licensure typically include a specified minimum level of practicing experience, as well as the successful completion of a nationally-administered 16-hour exam, and possibly an additional state-specific exam. For instance, California requires that candidates pass a national exam, written by the National Council of Examiners for Engineering and Surveying (NCEES), as well as a state-specific exam which includes a seismic portion and a surveying portion. In most states, application for license exam is requires four years of work experience after the candidate graduated from an ABET-accredited university and passing the fundamentals of Engineering exam, three years after receiving a master's degree, or two years after receiving a Ph.D. degree.

Most US states do not have a separate structural engineering license. In 10 US states, including Alaska, California, Hawaii, Illinois, Nevada, Oregon, Utah, Washington, and others, there is an additional license or authority for Structural Engineering, obtained after the engineer has obtained a Civil Engineering license and practiced an additional amount of time with the Civil Engineering license. The scope of what structures must be designed by a Structural Engineer, not by a Civil Engineer without the S.E. license, is limited in Alaska, California, Nevada, Oregon, Utah, and Washington to some high importance structures such as stadiums, bridges, hospitals, and schools. The practice of structural engineering is reserved entirely to S.E. licensees in Hawaii and Illinois.

The United Kingdom has one of the oldest professional institutions for structural engineers, the Institution of Structural Engineers. Founded as the Concrete Institute in 1908, it was renamed the Institution of Structural Engineers (IStructE) in 1922. It now has 22,000 members with branches in 32 countries.

The IStructE is one of several UK professional bodies empowered to grant the title of Chartered Engineer; its members are granted the title of Chartered Structural Engineer. The overall process to become chartered begins after graduation from a UK MEng degree, or a BEng with an MSc degree. To qualify as a chartered structural engineer, a graduate needs to go through four years of Initial Professional Development followed by a professional review interview. After passing the interview, the candidate sits an eight-hour professional review examination. The election to chartered membership (MIStructE) depends on the examination result. The candidate can register at the Engineering Council UK as a Chartered Structural Engineer once he or she has been elected as a Chartered Member. Legally it is not necessary to be a member of the IStructE when working on structures in the UK, however, industry practice, insurance, and liabilities dictate that an appropriately qualified engineer be responsible for such work.

== Career and remuneration ==
A 2010 survey of professionals occupying jobs in the construction industry showed that structural engineers in the UK earn an average wage of £35,009. The salary of structural engineers varies from sector to sector within the construction and built environment industry worldwide, depending on the project. For example, structural engineers working in public sector projects earn on average £37,083 per annum compared to the £43,947 average earned by those in commercial projects. Certain regions also represent higher average salaries, with structural engineers in the Middle East in all sectors, and of every level of experience, earning £45,083, compared to UK and EU countries where the average is £35,164.

== See also ==
- Architects
- Architectural engineering
- Building officials
- Civil engineering
- Earthquake engineering
- List of structural engineers
- List of structural engineering companies
- Structural engineering
- Structural failure
