= Institution of Structural Engineers =

Professional body for structural engineering based in the United Kingdom

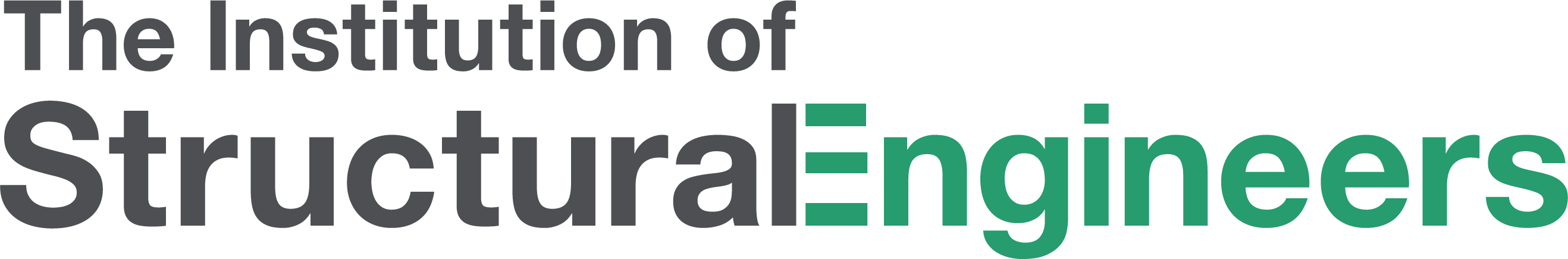

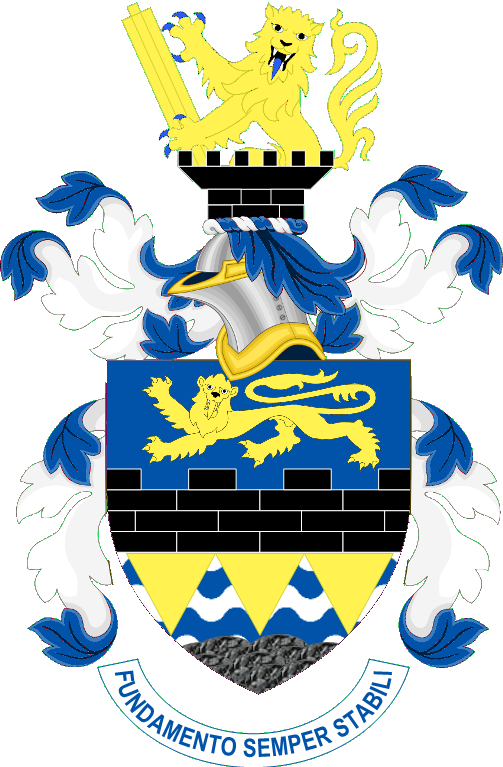
- Coat-of-arms
- Established: 21 July 1908; 118 years ago
- Type: professional association
- Professional title: Chartered Structural Engineer
- Location(s): London, EC1; United Kingdom
- Region served: worldwide
- Members: 30,000
- Key people: Brian Uy, president; Yasmin Becker, chief executive
- Website: istructe.org

The Institution of Structural Engineers is a British professional body for structural engineers.

In 2021, it had 29,900 members operating in 112 countries. It provides professional accreditation and publishes a magazine, The Structural Engineer, which has been produced monthly since 1924. It also has a research journal, Structures, published by Elsevier.

== History ==
The Institution gained its Royal Charter in March 1934, guided by the motto: Ne quid agatur, ne quis offendatur (“No action should be taken without due consideration of its potential consequences”). It was established at the Ritz Hotel, London on 21 July 1908 as the Concrete Institute, as the result of a need to define standards and rules for the proper use of concrete in the construction industry.

H. Kempton Dyson was one of the founder members and the first permanent secretary.

On 22 February 1909, the Institution was incorporated under the Companies Acts 1862–1907 as a company limited by guarantee not having a capital divided into shares. It was renamed the Institution of Structural Engineers in 1922, when its areas of interest were extended to cover 'structures' of all kinds. By 1925 the Institution had 1,700 members and has continued to grow over the years. It has fifty groups worldwide.

The first woman member to be elected as an Associate member was Florence Mary Taylor in 1926. It took until 1947 for Mary Irvine to be the first women to be elected a Chartered Member, and until 1954 when Marjem Chatterton was the first woman elected as a Fellow.

The Institution awards the Gold Medal annually, for outstanding contributions to the advancement of structural engineering. The first award was made in 1922 to Henry Adams.

== See also ==
- Construction Industry Council
- Engineering Council UK
- Institution of Civil Engineers
- Gold Medal of the Institution of Structural Engineers
- Structural Awards
