= List of multi-level bridges =

This is a list of bi-level and multi-level bridges. All entries are bi-level unless otherwise stated.

== Australia ==
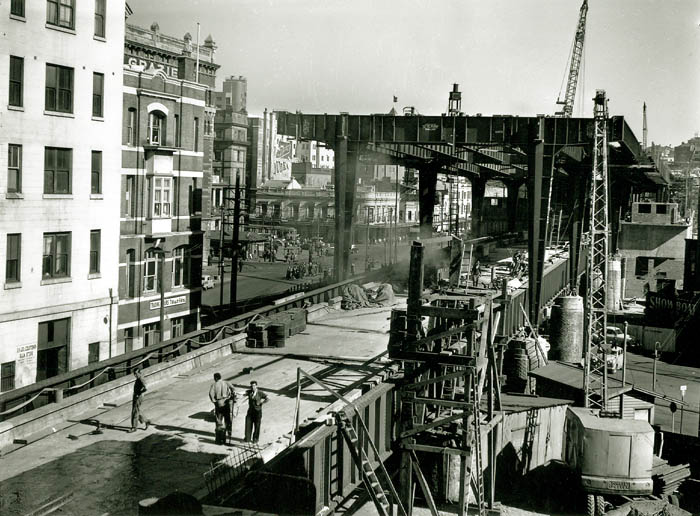
Cahill Expressway and Circular Quay Railway, Sydney, under construction in 1955

- Cahill Expressway viaduct (road and railway)
- Grafton Bridge (former railway and former road)
- Pyrmont Bridge (pedestrian, and former monorail)

== Austria ==
- Reichsbrücke, Vienna (road, subway, pedestrian)

== Bangladesh ==
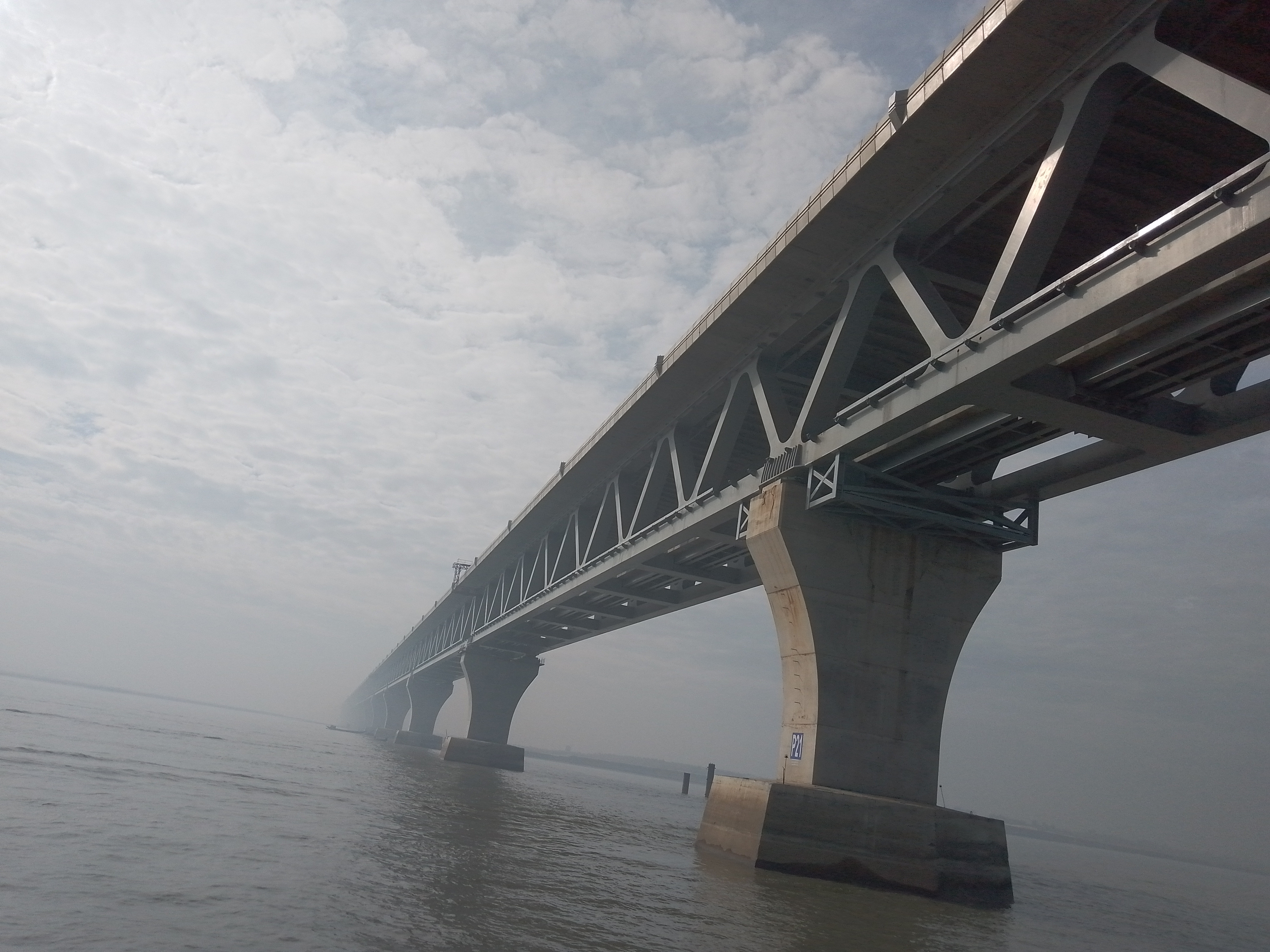
Padma Multipurpose Bridge in Bangladesh

- The Padma Multipurpose Bridge (railway and road)

== Canada ==
- Dudley B. Menzies Bridge (pedestrian walkway and light railway)
- High Level Bridge (railway and road)
- Prince Edward Viaduct (road and rapid transit)
- Anthony Henday Drive bridge over North Saskatchewan River (southeast) (road and bicycle/pedestrian)
- Whirlpool Rapids Bridge (railway and road)
- Centre Street Bridge, Calgary (road and road)

== France ==
- Cize–Bolozon viaduct (road and railway)
- Pont de Bir-Hakeim (road and Metro)
- Pont de Bercy (road and Metro)

== Germany ==
- Elstertalbrücke
- Göltzschtalbrücke
- Magdeburg Water Bridge (waterway and pedestrian)
- Oberbaumbrücke (road and u-bahn)

== China ==
=== Anhui ===
- Chizhou Yangtze River Rail-Road Bridge (road and railway)
- Ma'anshan Yangtze River Rail-Road Bridge (road and railway)
- Wuhu Yangtze River Bridge (road and railway)
- Third Wuhu Yangtze River Bridge (road and railway)
- Tongling Yangtze River Road-railway Bridge (road and railway)
- Third Tongling Yangtze River Bridge (road and railway)
- Huainan Huai River Bridge (road and railway)
- Jiuzi Bridge (road and pedestrian)

=== Chongqing ===
- Chaotianmen Bridge (road and rapid transit)
- Dongshuimen Bridge (road and rapid transit)
- Qianximen Bridge (road and rapid transit)
- Caiyuanba Bridge (road and monorail)
- Baijusi Yangtze River Bridge (road and rapid transit)
- New Baishatuo Yangtze River Railway Bridge (two railways)
- Zengjiayan Bridge (road and rapid transit)
- Dingshan Bridge (road and rapid transit)
- Guojiatuo Yangtze River Bridge (road and rapid transit)
- Hongyancun Bridge (road and rapid transit)
- Huangjueping Yangtze River bridge (two roads and rapid transit)

=== Fujian ===
- Pingtan Strait Rail-Road Bridge (road and railway)
- Daoqingzhou Bridge (road and rapid transit)

=== Guangdong ===
- Zhongshan Xiangshan Bridge (two roads)
- Zhaoqing Xijiang Bridge (road and railway)

=== Henan ===
- Zhengxin Yellow River Bridge (road and railway)

=== Heilongjiang ===
- Binbei Bridge (road and railway)

=== Hong Kong ===
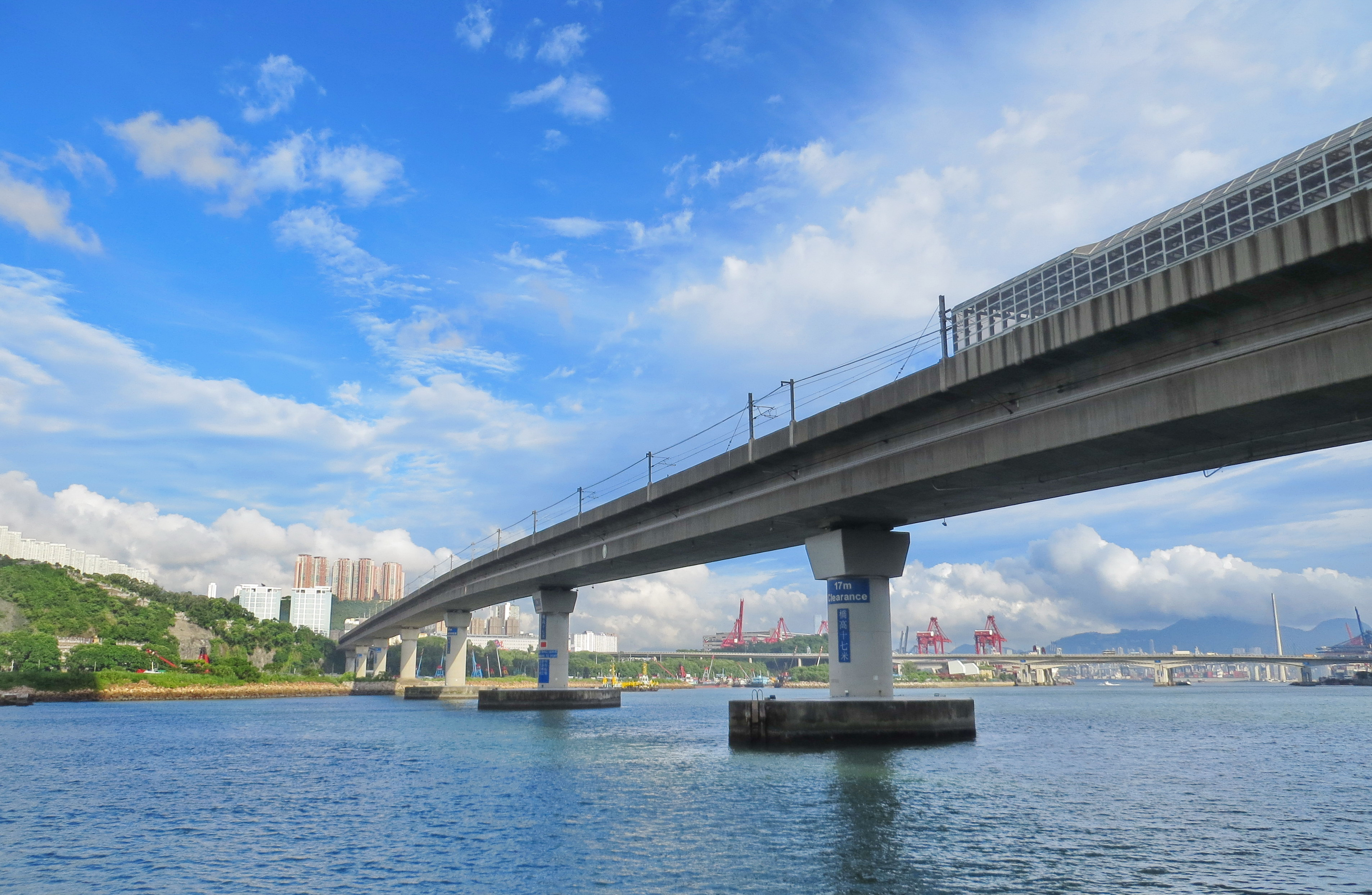
Rambler Channel Bridge

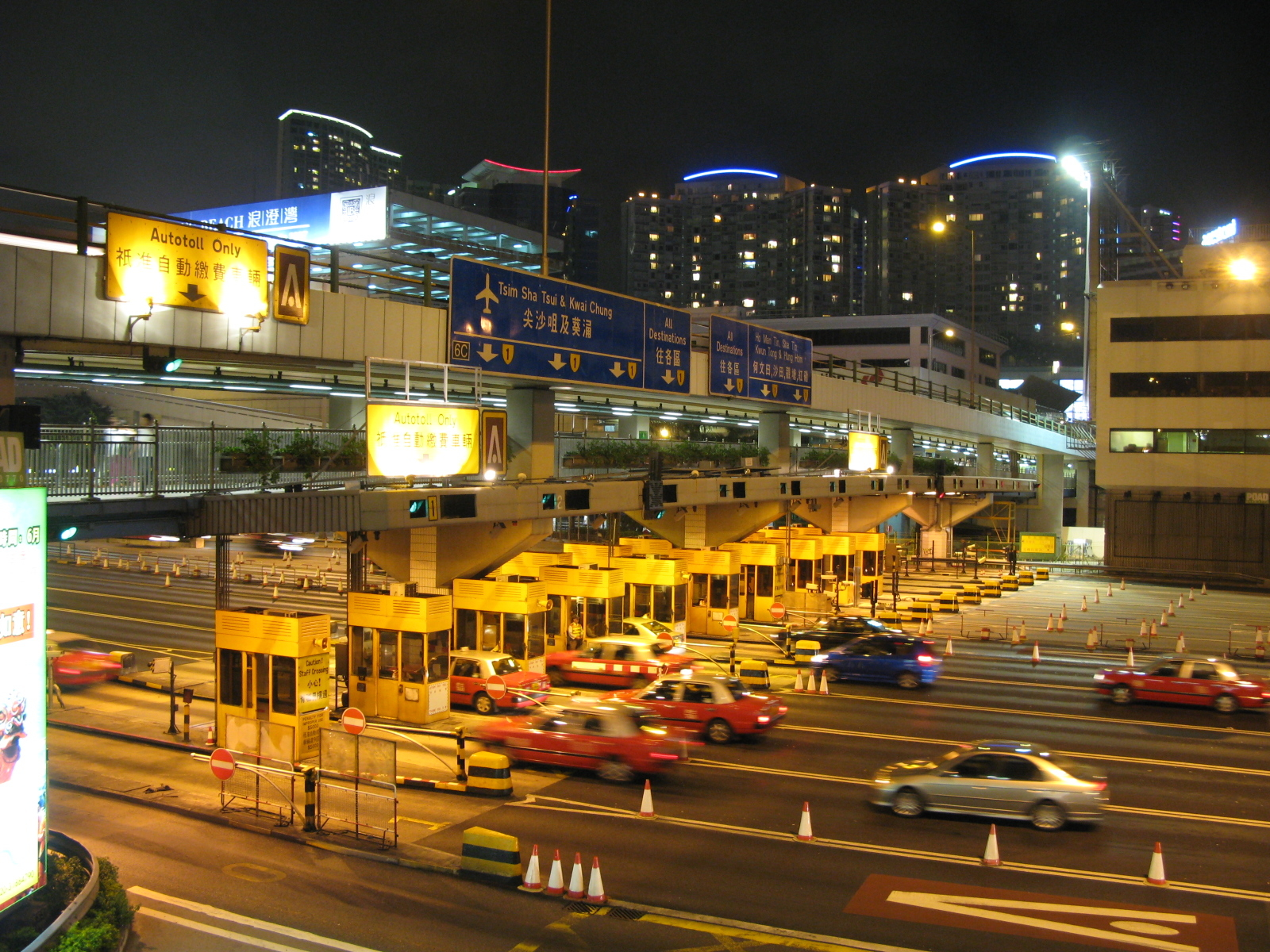
Cheong Wan Road - Flyover and footbridge across Cross-Harbour Tunnel's toll plaza

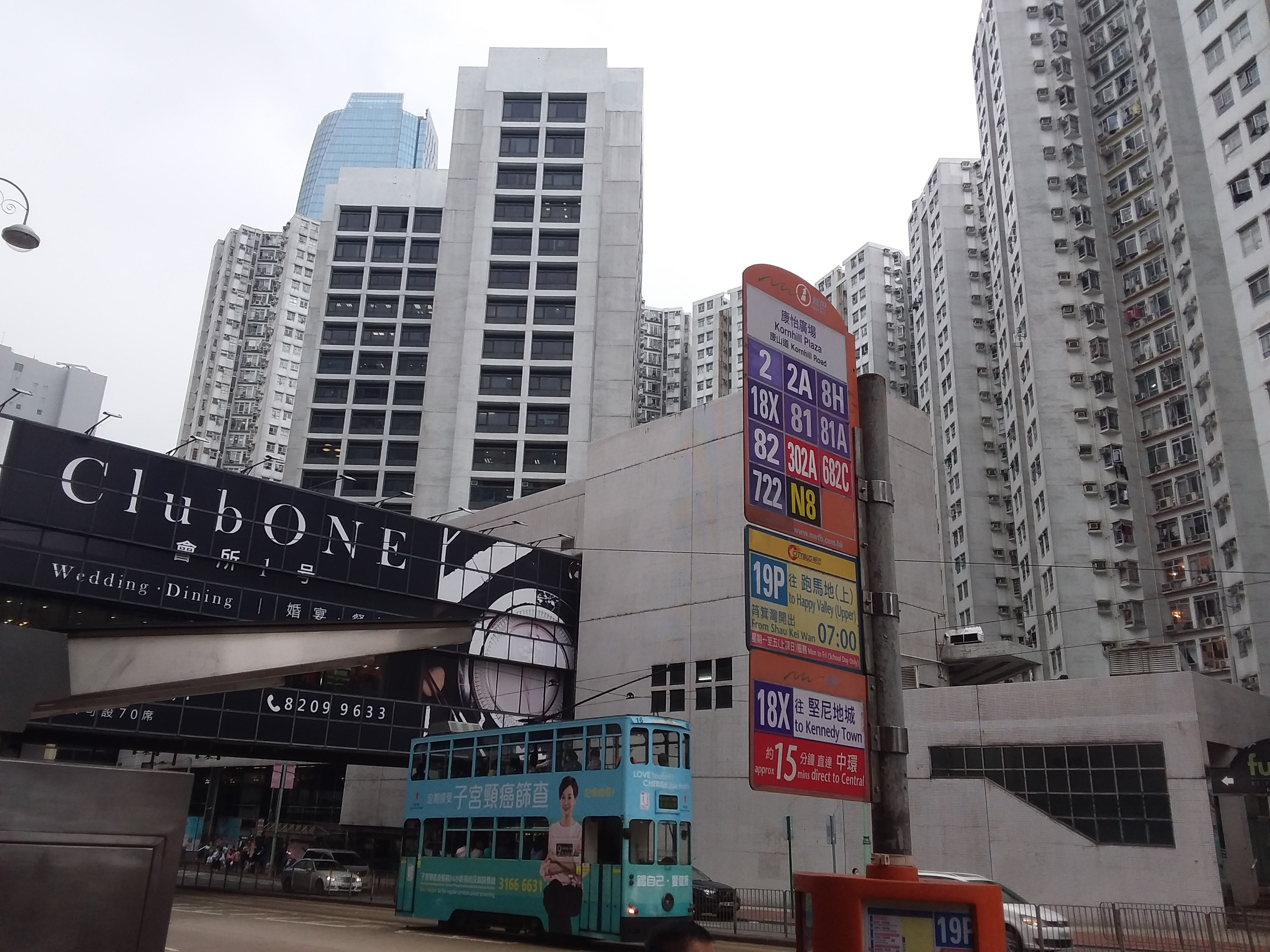
Eastern footbridge across Kornhill Road

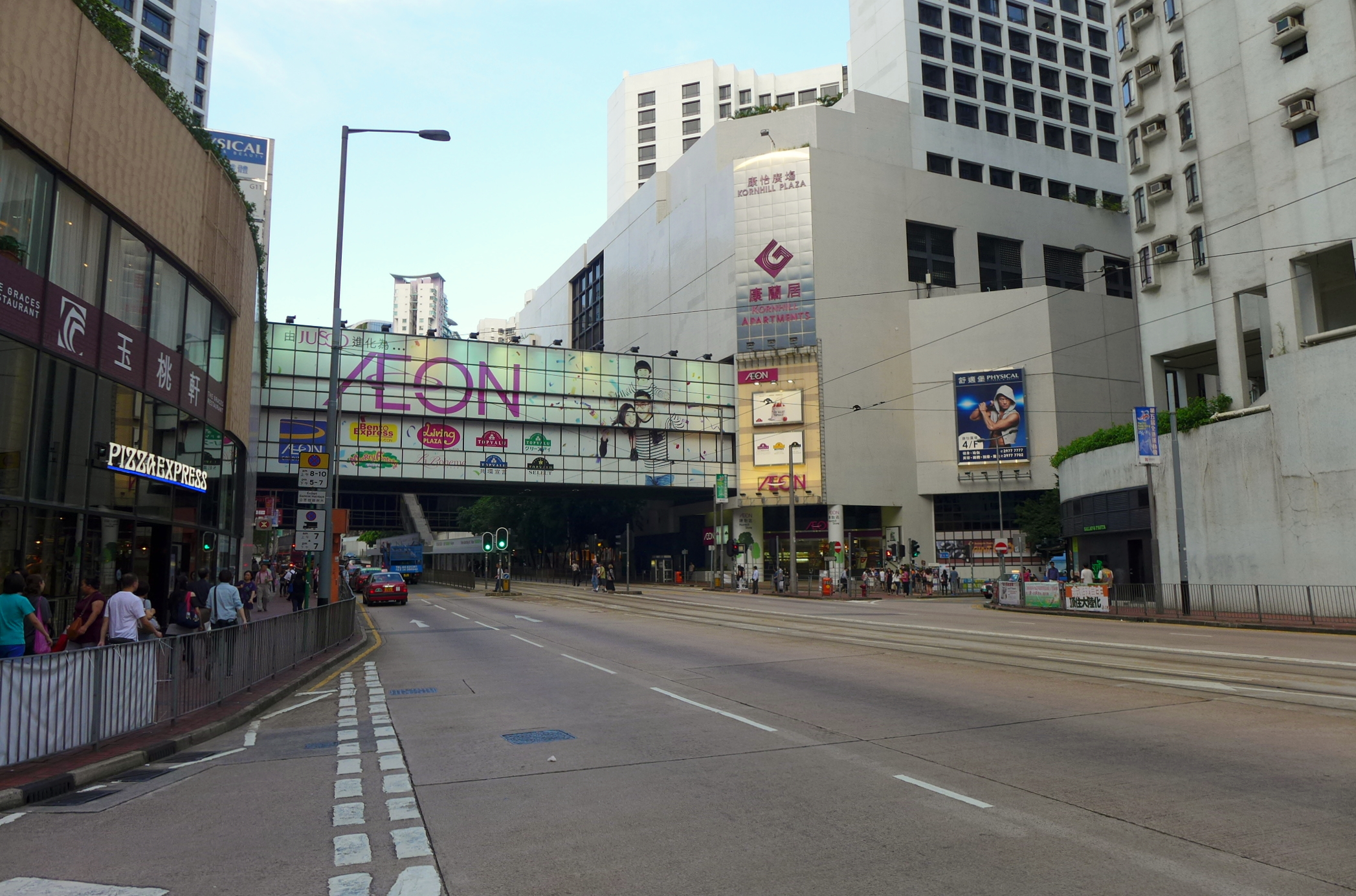
Western footbridge across Kornhill Road

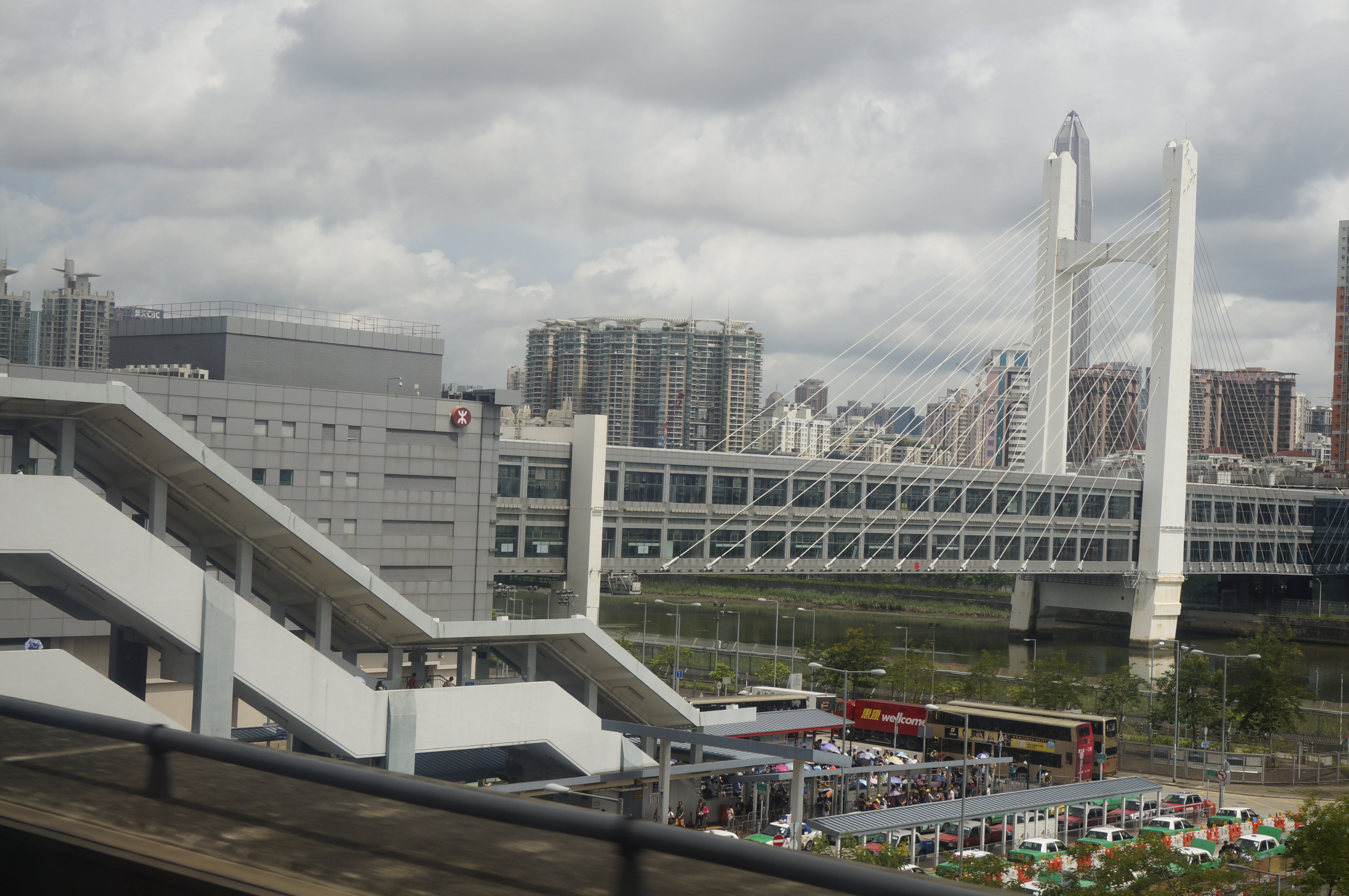
Footbridge between Lok Ma Chau station and Futian Port

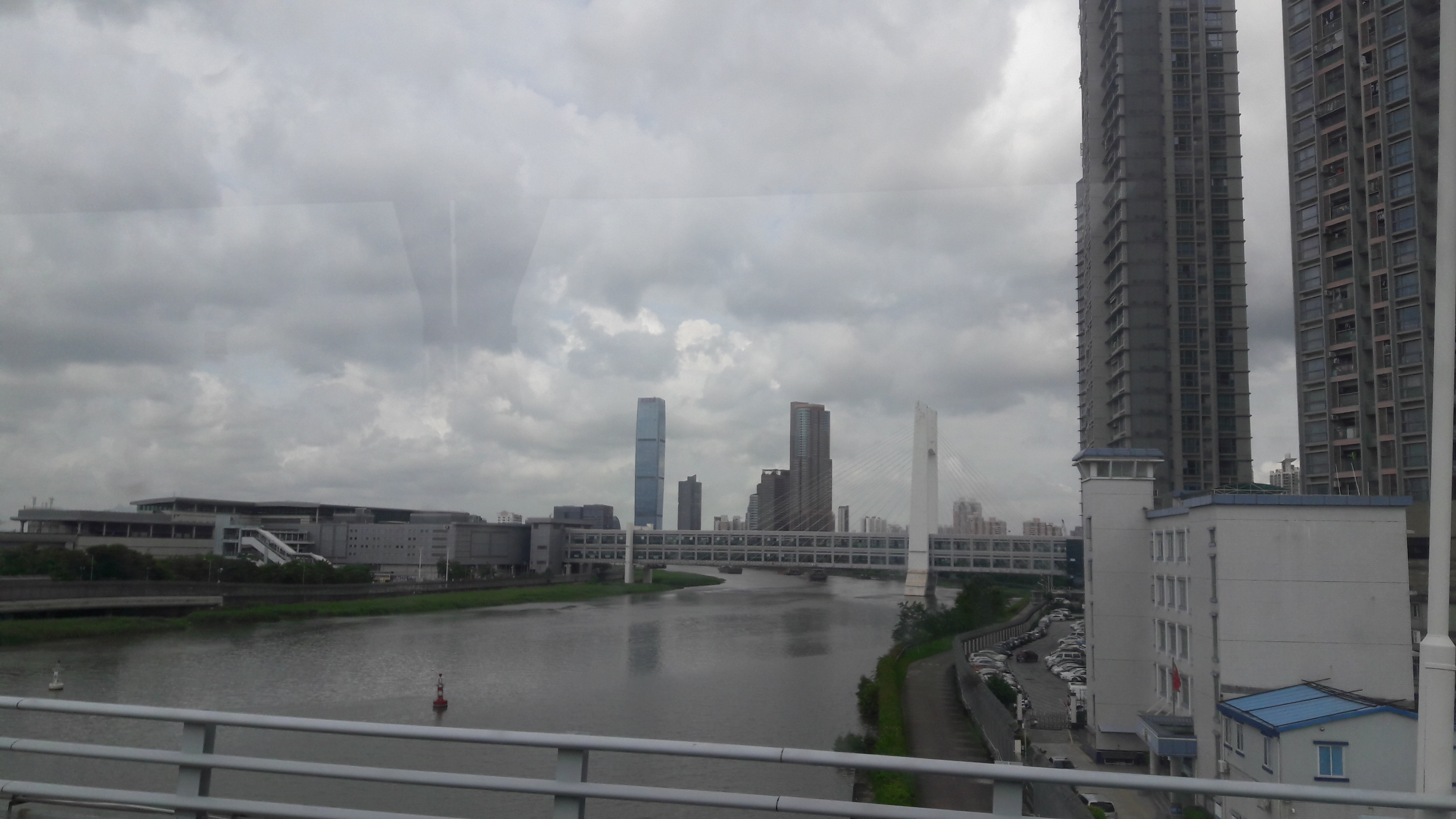
Footbridge between Lok Ma Chau station and Futian Port

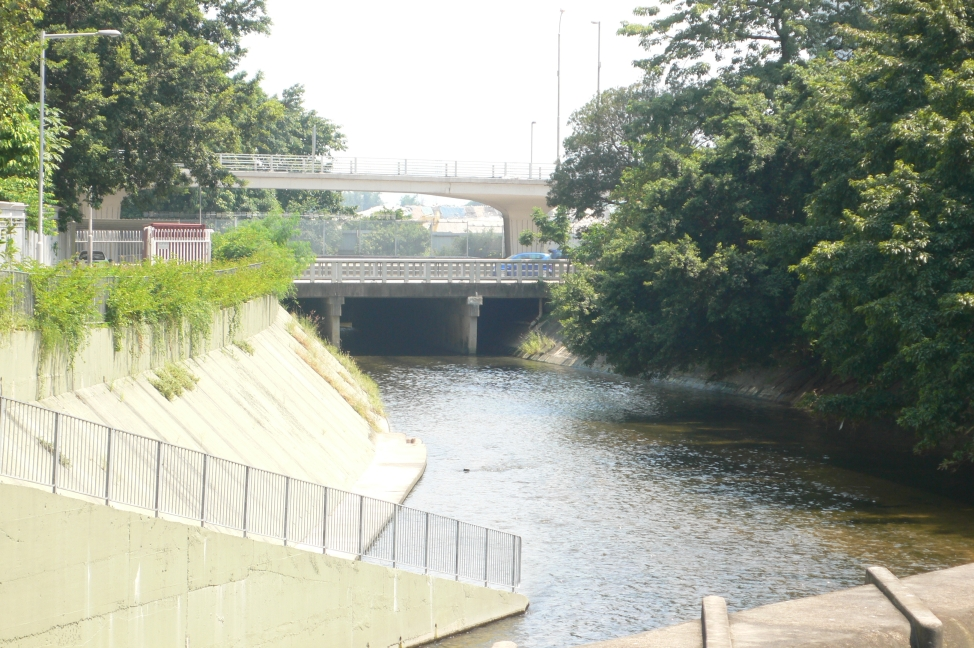
Prince Edward Road East over Kai Tak Nullah

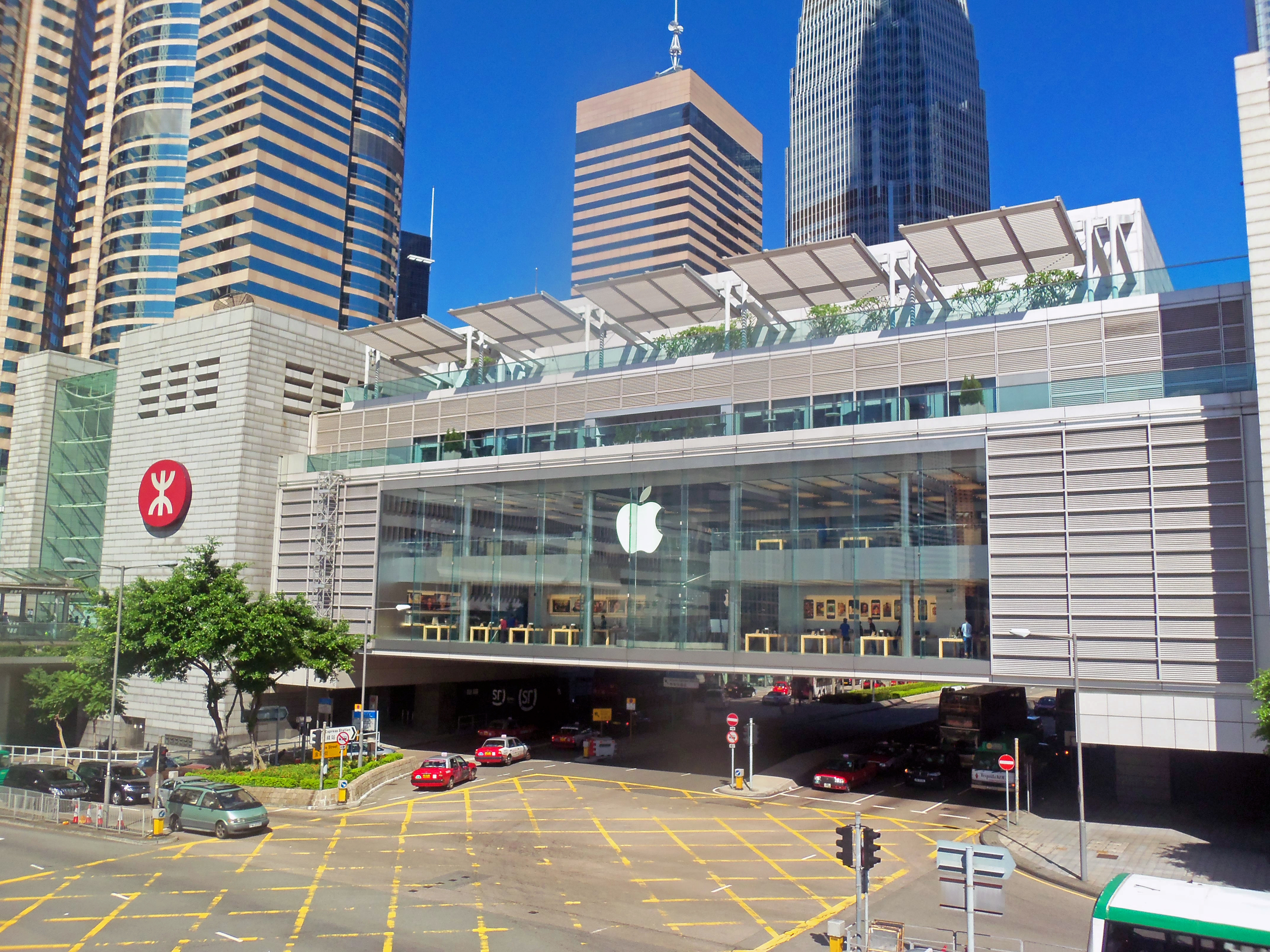
Man Cheung Street between One and Two International Finance Centre

- East Rail and a footbridge across Argyle Street
- Between the north block and south block of Bowrington Market
- Canal Road Flyover and the Canal Road bus lanes, and Wong Nai Chung Gap Flyover and Morrison Hill Road – (westernmost stretch of) Wong Nai Chung Road, over Bowrington Canal
- Cheong Wan Road (road and footbridge)
- A bi-level footbridge between two blocks of the Children's Hospital
- A bridge at Citygate Outlets across North Lantau Highway and Tat Tung Road
- Between Chow Yei Ching Building and the Jockey Club Tower in the University of Hong Kong (the former part of the Main Campus and the latter the Centennial Campus)
- The Atrium Link between phases one and two of the Convention and Exhibition Centre, and the Atrium Link Extension
- Conduit Road Flyover and footbridge
- Between the two towers of the Cullinan
- A footbridge between Domain and Lei Yue Mun Plaza shopping centre
- Between Haking Wong Building in the main campus of the University of Hong Kong and HKU station
- Two footbridges between Hilton Plaza and New Town Plaza Phase III
- Island Eastern Corridor between Power Street and Hoi Yu Street
- Tri-level footbridge parallel to Lei Tung Street
- Two footbridges across Man Cheung Street between One International Finance Centre and Two International Finance Centre
- Kap Shui Mun Bridge (road and rapid transit)
- Two footbridges across Kornhill Road between Kornhill Plaza North and Kornhill Plaza South
- Kwun Tong Road and Kwun Tong line across Tsui Ping Nullah (road and rapid transit)
- A footbridge between Lo Wu Control Point and Luohu Port (pedestrian; cross-border)
- A footbridge between Lok Ma Chau Spur Line Control Point and Futian Port (pedestrian; cross-border)
- Ma Wan Viaduct (road and rapid transit)
- Between blocks A and B of Mei Sun Lau at 442 Des Voeux Road West and 489–499 Queen's Road West
- Ngan Yat House in Ngan Wan Estate
- A bridge across Pak Hok Ting Street, connecting New Town Plaza I and III
- PMQ — CUBE and PLATEAU between the Staunton and the Hollywood blocks
- Footbridge connecting two buildings of Christian Churches Union Pokfulam Road Cemetery
- Prince Edward Road East across Kai Tak Nullah (flyover and ground-level road over a nullah)
- Rambler Channel Bridge (aka. Tsing Lai Bridge) (rapid transit, two tracks on each of the two levels)
- East Rail and a footbridge across Prince Edward Road West
- Three bridges across Sha Tin Centre Street that are part of New Town Plaza I
- Bridge between New Town Plaza I and Citylink Plaza and Sha Tin station across Tai Po Road — Sha Tin and East Rail
- Between the north and south blocks of S.K.H. St. Peter's Primary School
- A footbridge across Shek Yam Street
- Tai Po Road — Tai Wai and Tsing Sha Highway over East Rail (two levels of flyovers and a footbridge over railway tracks)
- Tsing Ma Bridge (road and rapid transit)
- Tsing Kwai Highway, Tung Chung line and Airport Express (road and four tracks of rapid transit) - two stretches
- Tsing Sha Highway
- A flyover connecting Tsuen King Circuit and Sha Tsui Road (road and pedestrian)
- A footbridge over Wang Pok Street connecting Lucky Plaza and Sha Tin Centre
- A footbridge over Wang Tau Hom East Road, part of Lok Fu Place
- Two footbridges over Wang Tau Hom South Road, part of Lok Fu Place
- Yasumoto Bridge and Fruit Bat Bridge

=== Hubei ===
- Wuhan Yangtze River Bridge (road and railway)
- Huanggang Yangtze River Bridge (road and railway)
- Tianxingzhou Yangtze River Bridge (road and railway)
- Yangsigang Yangtze River Bridge (two roads)
- Jingzhou Yangtze River road-railway bridge (road and railway)
- Libu Yangtze River Rail/Road Bridge (road and railway)
- Zhicheng Yangtze River Bridge (road and railway)

=== Hunan ===
- Hengyang Xiangjiang Road-railway Bridge (road and railway)

=== Liaoning ===
- Sino-Korean Friendship Bridge (road and railway)

=== Macau ===
- Sai Van Bridge (road and rapid transit)

=== Jiangsu ===
- Nanjing Yangtze River Bridge (road and railway)
- Wufengshan Yangtze River Bridge (railway and road)
- Changtai Yangtze River Bridge (railway and road)
- Husutong Yangtze River Bridge (railway and road)

=== Jiangxi ===
- Jiujiang Yangtze River Bridge (road and railway)

=== Shanghai ===
- Minpu No. 2 Bridge (road and rapid transit)
- Songpu Bridge (road and railway)
- Minpu Bridge (two roads)

=== Sichuang ===
- Baodin bridge (road and transit)

=== Zhejiang ===
- Qiantang River Bridge (road and railway)
- Third Qiantang River Bridge (two roads)
- New Pengbu Bridge (rapid transit and road)
- Xihong Bridge (two roads)
- Yongning Bridge (rapid transit and two roads)
- Oujiang Beikou Bridge (two roads)

== Czech Republic ==
- Nusle Bridge, Prague (metro and road)

== India ==
- Bogibeel Bridge (railway and road)
- Naranarayan Setu (railway and road)
- Rajendra Bridge (railway and road)
- Digha-Sonpur Bridge (railway and road)
- Munger Ganga Bridge (railway and road)
- Godavari Bridge (railway and road)
- Umshiang Double-Decker Root Bridge

== Iran ==
- Si-o-se-pol

== Iraq ==
- The Two stories bridge in Baghdad crosses river of Tigris, carryoing two levels of roadway.

== Italy ==
- The Viadotto Soleri in Cuneo, inaugurated in 1937 but partially rebuilt after it was seriously damaged by the German Army at the end of WWII, crosses the Stura river.

== Japan ==
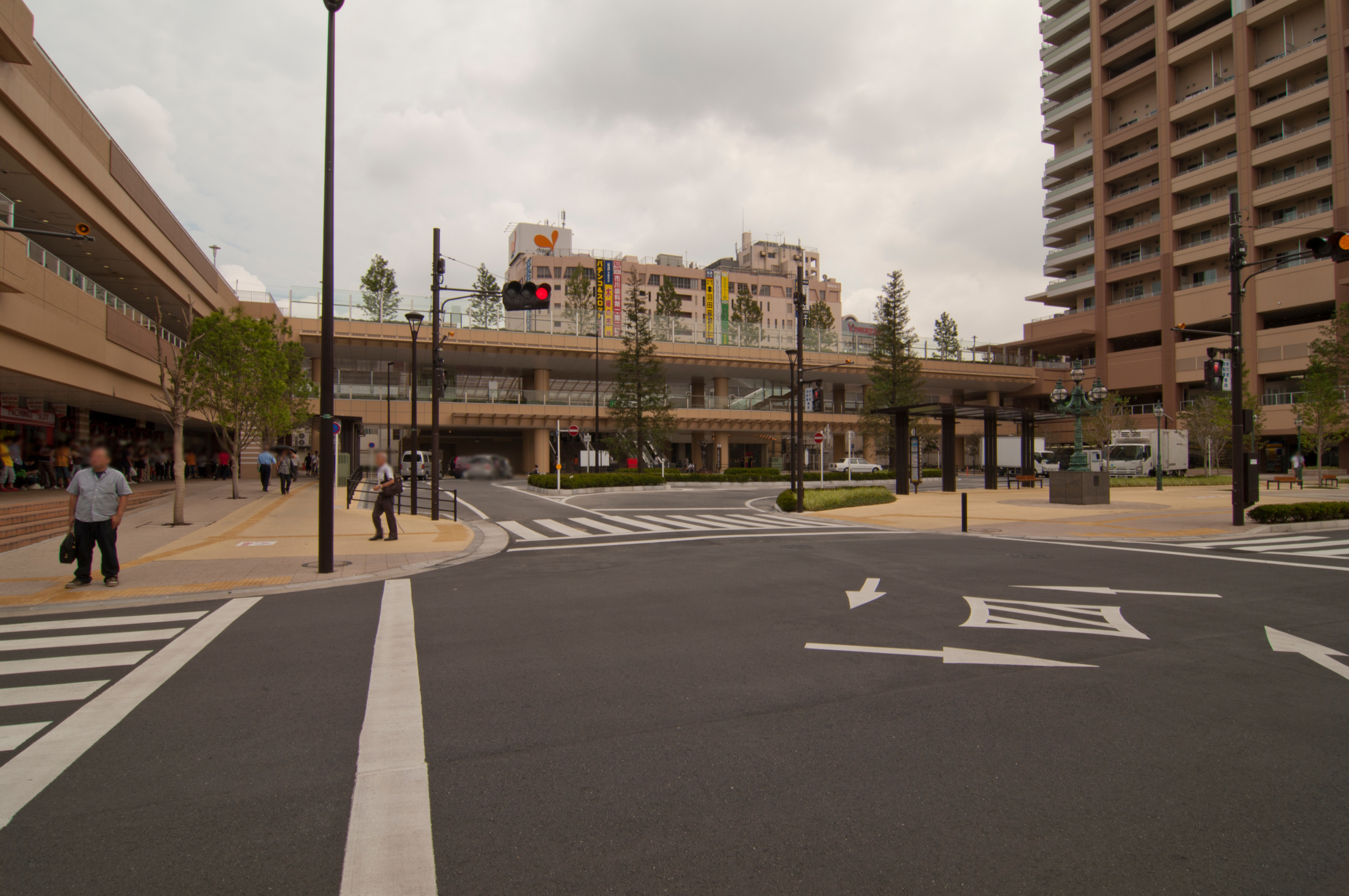
Ichikawa station

- Ichikawa Station's forecourt
- Kobe Bridge, (two roads)
- Sky Gate Bridge R at Kansai International Airport, carrying JR West, Nankai Railway and a six-lane expressway
- Nakanose Bridge, Sendai, Miyagi, over Hirose River (Miyagi)
- Rainbow Bridge, over Tokyo Bay in Tokyo, (train, road, pedestrian traffic)
- Great Seto Bridge, (railway and road)
- Goshikizakura-o-hashi, (two roads)
- Minato Bridge, (two roads)
- Okuma-river truss bridge, (two roads)
- Rokko Bridge, (railway and road)
- Rokko Island Bridge, (two roads)
- Ryogoku Ohashi Bridge, (two roads)
- Shin-Gounokawa bridge, (two roads)
- Sumidagawa Bridge, (two roads)
- Yokohama Bay Bridge, (two roads)
- Tamagawa Bridge, (two roads)

== Luxembourg ==
- Adolphe Bridge (tram, road, pedestrian and bicycle traffic)

== Malaysia ==
- Kota Bridge, Klang, Selangor
- Double-decker sky bridge between the two towers of the Petronas Towers, Kuala Lumpur

== New Zealand ==
- Bridge No 7 on the Driving Creek Railway, (two levels of railway)

== Poland ==
- Gdański Bridge, Warsaw (road and tramway)

== Portugal ==
- Dom Luís I Bridge (two levels, tramway and road)
- 25 de Abril Bridge (road and railway)
- Ponte Eiffel (road and railway)
- Ponte de Valença (road and railway), in Valença, Portugal

== Russia ==
- Luzhniki Metro Bridge in Moscow (subway and road)
- ZSD in Saint Petersburg

== Slovakia ==
- Harbour Bridge in Bratislava (road and railway)

== Slovenia ==
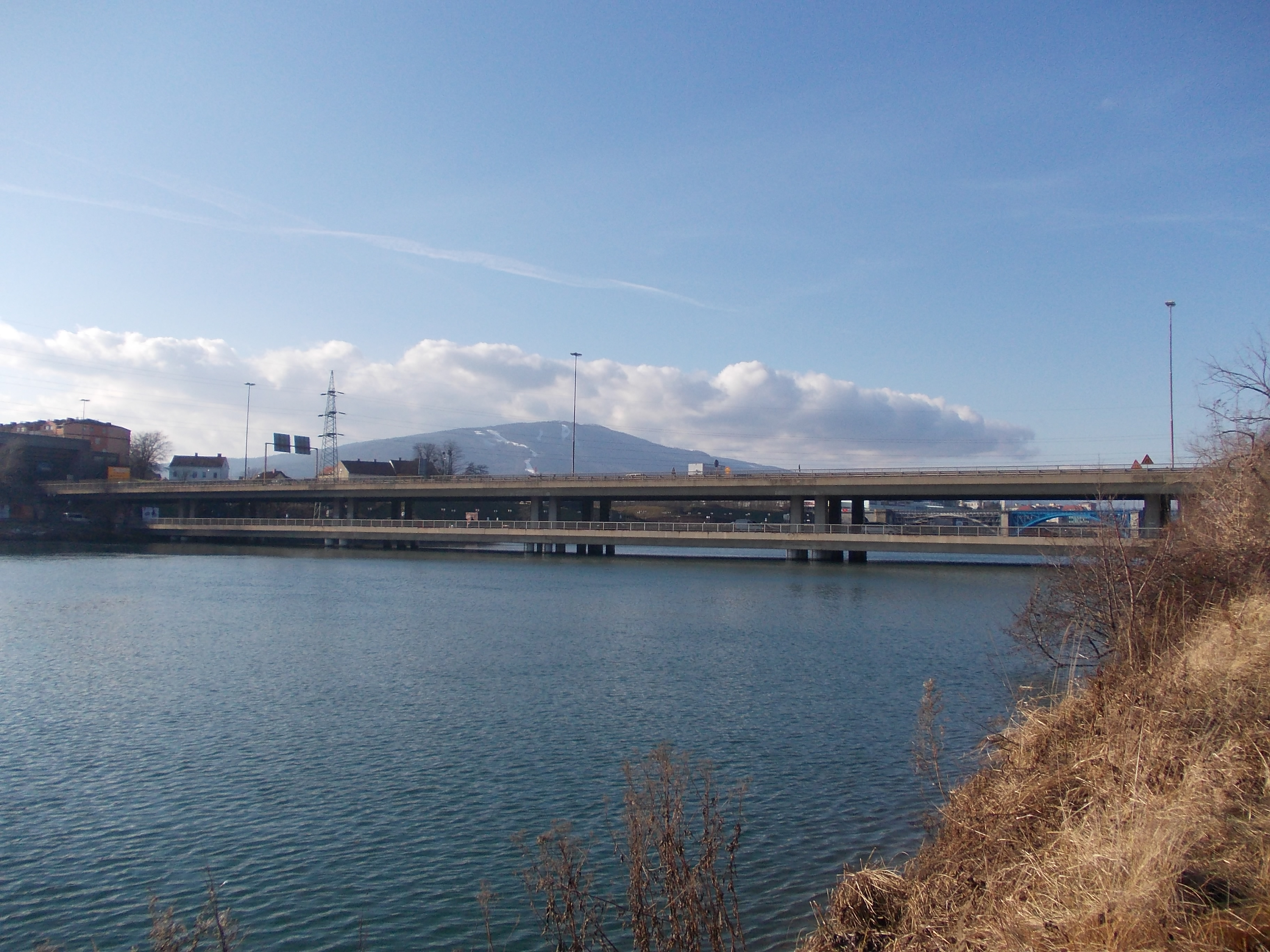
Double-deck bridge in Maribor, Slovenia

- Dvoetažni most in Maribor (two levels of roadway)

== Sweden ==
- Sankt Eriksbron (road and metro)
- Øresund Bridge (road and railway; partially located within Danish waters, connecting with the Danish island of Peberholm)

== Taiwan ==
- Wuku–Yangmei Elevated Road in Taipei and Taoyuan counties
- Kin-Ma Bridge in Changhwa County
- First MacArthur Bridge in Taipei

== United Kingdom ==
- Craigavon Bridge (two levels of roadway)
- High Level Bridge, Newcastle upon Tyne, Gateshead (railway and roadway)
- Tinsley Viaduct, Sheffield (M1 motorway and local road)
- Britannia Bridge Menai Strait (road and railway)

== United States ==
- San Francisco–Oakland Bay Bridge (two levels of roadways)
- Richmond–San Rafael Bridge (two levels of roadways)
- Interstate 229 (Missouri) (two levels of roadways)
- Interstate 64 in Missouri (two levels of roadways)
- I Street Bridge (roadway and railroad)
- Washington Avenue Bridge (pedestrian and roadway)
- George Washington Bridge (two levels of roadways)
- Verrazzano–Narrows Bridge (two levels of roadways)
- Manhattan Bridge (two levels of roadways)
- Queensboro Bridge (two levels of roadways)
- Henry Hudson Bridge (two levels of roadways)
- Tobin Bridge (two levels of roadways)
- Girard Point Bridge (two levels of roadways)
- Fort Pitt Bridge (two levels of roadways)
- Fort Duquesne Bridge (two levels of roadways)
- Fort Madison Toll Bridge (swing bridge for roadway and railway)
- Sherman Minton Bridge (two levels of roadways)
- Steel Bridge (roadway and railway)
- Meridian Highway Bridge (two levels for pedestrians only)
- Marquam Bridge (two levels of roadways)
- Michigan Avenue Bridge (DuSable Bridge)
- Ship Canal Bridge (two levels of roadways)
- Fremont Bridge (Portland, Oregon) (two levels of roadways)
- Brent Spence Bridge (two levels of roadways)
- Williamsburg Bridge (pedestrian and roadway)
- Whirlpool Rapids Bridge (railway and roadway)
- Sarah Mildred Long Bridge (railway and roadway)
- Portage Canal Lift Bridge (abandoned railway and roadway)
- Carlton Bridge (abandoned roadway and railway)
- Kansas City Highline Bridge (two levels of railway)
- Central Avenue Bridge (Kansas City, Kansas) (two levels of roadways)
- 12th Street Viaduct (Kansas City, Missouri) (two levels of roadways)
- 5-in-1 Bridge, Cedar Rapids, Iowa (two levels of roadway above a Cedar River dam)
- Eads Bridge (roadway and railway)
- Multilevel streets in Chicago
  - Columbus Drive
  - Lake Shore Drive
  - Michigan Avenue
  - Randolph Street
  - Stetson Avenue
  - Wacker Drive
  - South Water Street
- Bi-level walkway bridge at Denver International Airport

== Vietnam ==
- Thăng Long Bridge (road and railway)

== See also ==
- List of road–rail bridges
