= Zhongshan Xiangshan Bridge =

Zhongshan Xiangshan Bridge 中山香山大桥
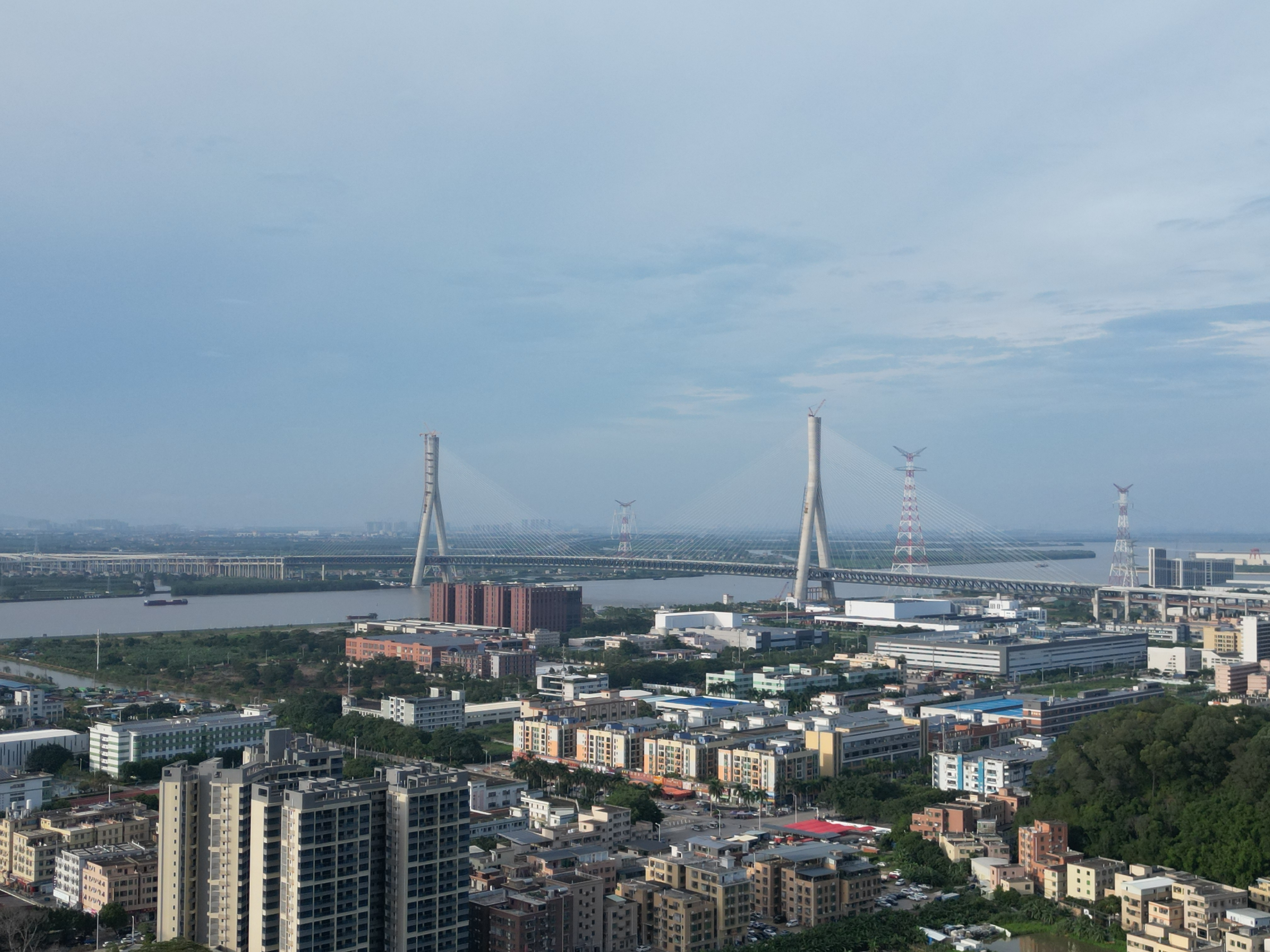
- Coordinates: 22°34′43″N 113°32′25″E
- Carries: S77 Zhongshan East Ring Expressway; Mingu Expressway
- Crosses: Hengmen Waterway (Xi River)
- Locale: Zhongshan, Guangdong, China

Characteristics
- Design: double deck cable-stayed bridge
- Material: Steel, concrete
- Total length: 1,776 m (5,827 ft)
- Width: 42.2 m (138 ft)
- Height: 272.8 m (895 ft)
- Longest span: 880 m (2,890 ft)
- No. of lanes: 16

History
- Construction start: 8 November 2020

Location
- Interactive map of Zhongshan Xiangshan Bridge

The Zhongshan Xiangshan Bridge (Chinese: 中山香山大桥) is an under construction bridge over the Hengmen Waterway (Xi River) in Zhongshan, Guangdong, China. The bridge is one of the longest two levels cable-stayed bridge in the world.

== See also ==
- List of bridges in China
- List of longest cable-stayed bridge spans
- List of tallest bridges
- List of multi-level bridges
