= Liushi, Yueqing =

Liushi 柳市镇
- Town
- Location in Zhejiang
- Coordinates: 28°2′30″N 120°53′18″E
- Country: People's Republic of China
- Province: Zhejiang
- Prefecture-level city: Wenzhou
- County-level city: Yueqing
- Time zone: UTC+8 (China Standard)

Liushi (Chinese: 柳市) is a town of Yueqing, Zhejiang, China. As of 2018, it has nine residential communities and 158 villages under its administration.
