= Yueqing =

Yueqing 乐清市 Yotsing, Leqing
- County-level city
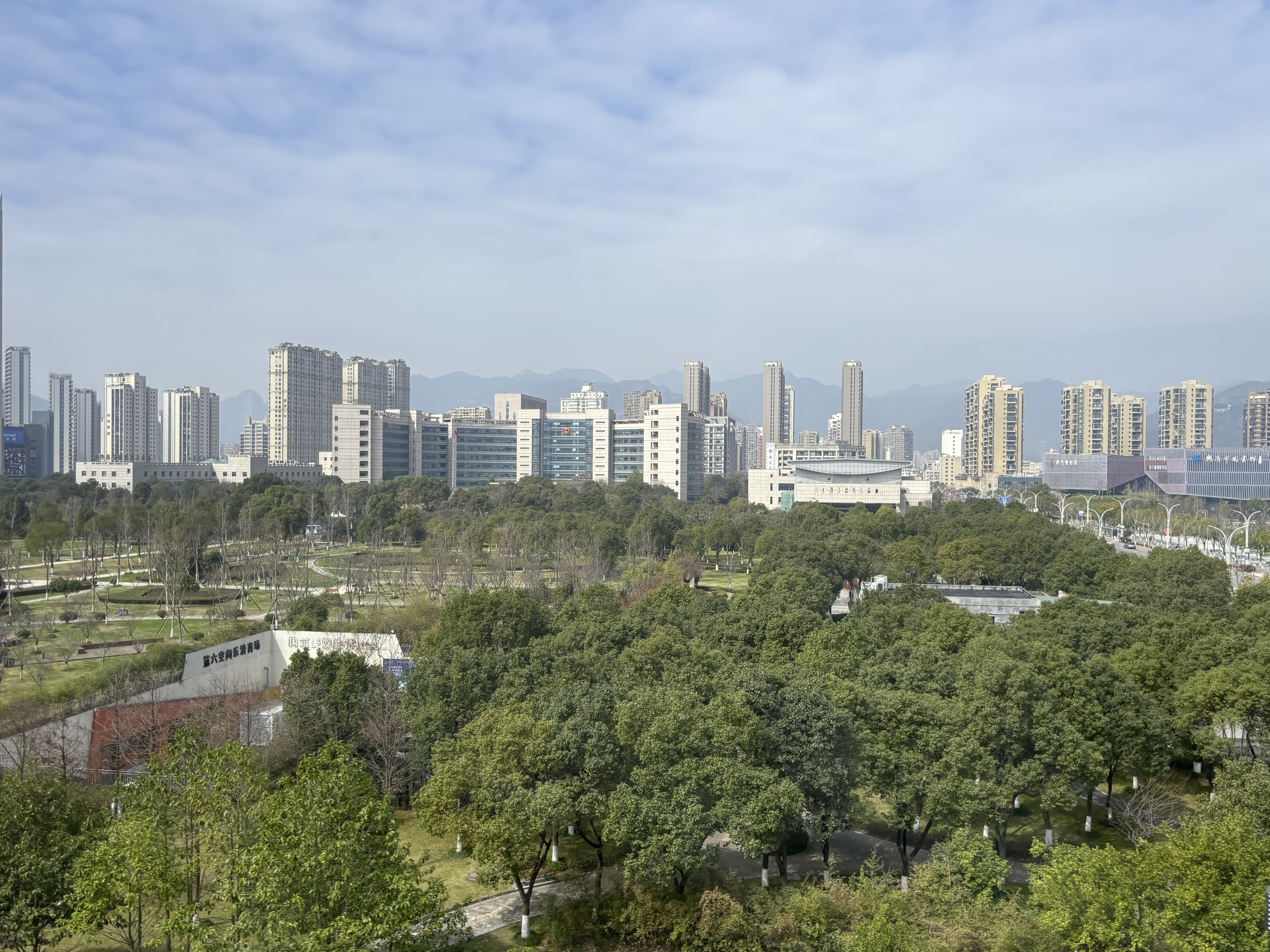
- Citizen Square

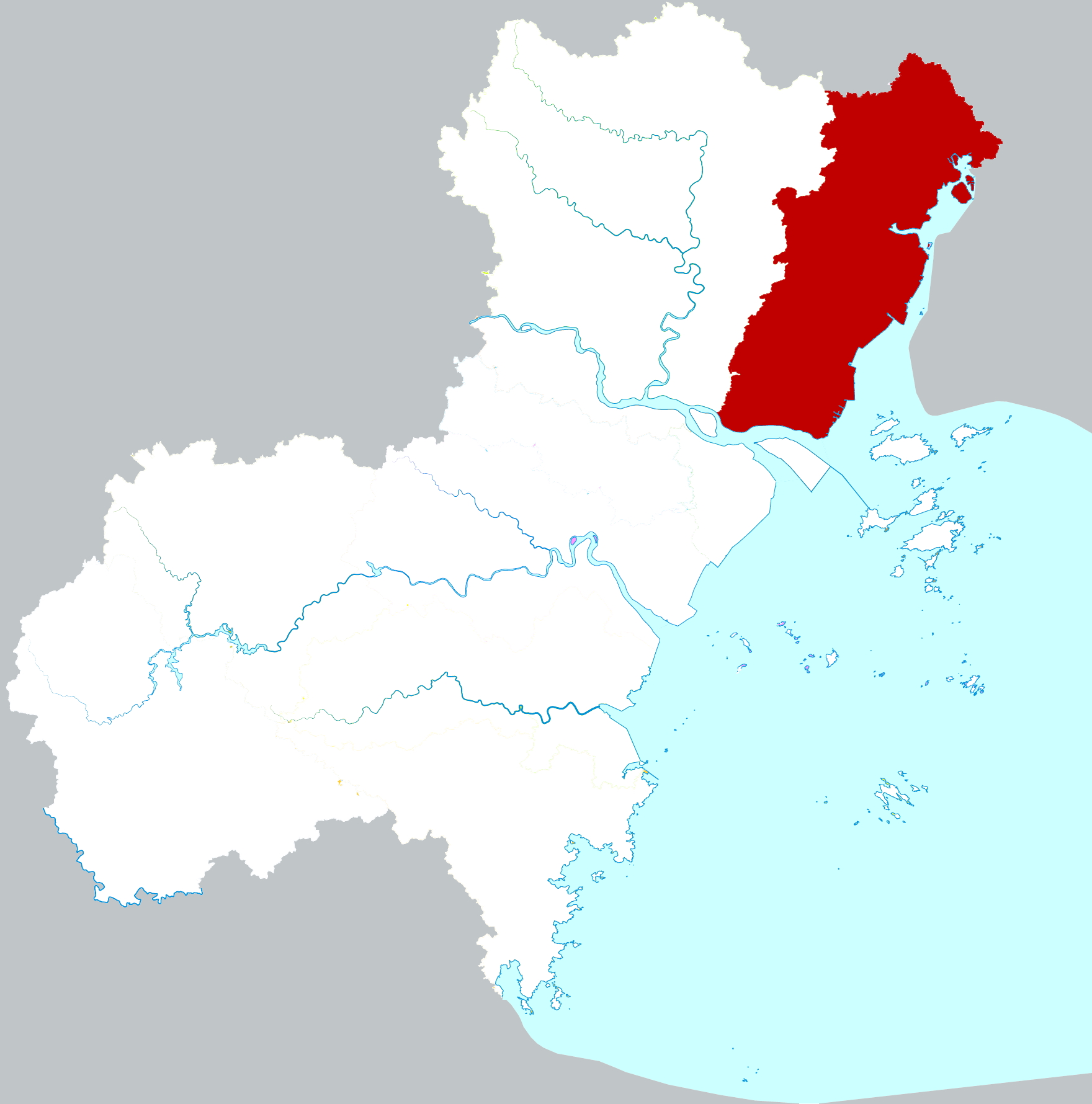
- Location of Yueqing City within Wenzhou

- Location in Zhejiang
- Coordinates: 28°07′N 120°58′E
- Country: People's Republic of China
- Province: Zhejiang
- Prefecture-level city: Wenzhou

Area
  - Total: 1,669.3 km^{2} (644.5 sq mi)
  - Land: 1,385 km^{2} (535 sq mi)
  - Water: 284.3 km^{2} (109.8 sq mi)

Population
  - Total: 488,980
- Time zone: UTC+8 (China Standard)

Yueqing (Chinese: 乐清市; pinyin: Yuèqīng Shì) is a county-level city under the administration of Wenzhou, Zhejiang Province, in eastern China. It lies on the coast of the East China Sea, by the Yueqing Bay. Much of the Yandang Mountains lie in Yueqing.

== History ==
=== Ancient China (until 1839) ===
Jin Xiaowu Ningkang two years (374 AD), divided into Zhilecheng County, Yongning County, Yongjia County. Belonging to Yongjia County, Jianxian County began from now on. Song, Qi, Liang and Chen of the Southern dynasty. Emperor Wendi of the Sui dynasty opened the Emperor for nine years (AD 589). In the twelve years since the founding of the Emperor, the prefecture was changed to Kuozhou, and Lecheng County of the province entered Yongjia County, which belonged to Kuozhou Yongjia County. In the three years of Emperor Yangdi (AD 607), the state was changed to a county, and Kuozhou was changed to Yongjia County. Five years of Tang Wude (622 AD), reanalyzed Zhijiacheng County of Yongjia County, which belongs to Dongjiazhou. In the seven years of Wude, Lecheng County of Fuxing Province entered Yongning County; in the second year of the Yuan dynasty (AD 675), Wenzhou was established. In the first year of the beginning of the year (AD 689), it was divided into Yongjia County and resettlement into Lecheng County, which is Shang County and belongs to Wenzhou. In the first year of Tianbao (AD 742), Wenzhou was renamed Yongjia County, and Lecheng County belonged to it. In the first year of Qianyuan (AD 758), Yongjia County was restored to Wenzhou, and Lecheng County belonged to it. In the second year of Liang Kaiping (908 AD) after the fifth generation, in order to avoid the taboo of Liang Cheng's grandfather Zhu Cheng, the county was renamed Yueqing and belongs to Wenzhou. After Jin Tianfu four years (AD 939), Yueqing County belonged to Wu Yueguo Wenzhou Jing Naval Festival. Song Taiping rejuvenated the country for three years (AD 978), Wenzhou was reduced to a military state, and Yueqing County belonged to Liangzhe Road Wenzhou Military State. In the 7th year of Zhenghe (1117 AD), Wenzhou was promoted to the Yingdao Army, and Yueqing County belonged to it. In the three years of Jianyan in the Southern Song dynasty (1129 AD), the strike amount was restored to Wenzhou, and Yueqing County belonged to Wenzhou on Liangzhe East Road. In the first year of Xianchun (1265 AD), Wenzhou was promoted to Ruian House, which belonged to Yueqing County.

From the thirteenth year of Yuan to Yuan (1276 AD), Yueqing County entered the territory, which belongs to Wenzhou Road, East Zhejiang Road, Jianghuai Province. In the twenty-seventh year of Zhengzheng (1367 AD), Yueqing County was attached to Zhu Wu. In the first year of Hongwu in the Ming dynasty (AD 1368), the road was changed to a prefecture, and Yueqing County belonged to Wenzhou, Zhejiang Province. In the ninth year of Hongwu, the province was changed to the chief administrative officer, and Yueqing County belonged to Wenzhou Mansion, the chief administrative officer of Zhejiang. In the three years of Shunzhi Qing (1646 AD), Yueqing County entered the Qing dynasty, and was under the jurisdiction of the Wenzhou Mansion of the Minister of Administration of Zhejiang Province.

=== Modern (1840-1918) ===
In the three years to Xuantong (1911 AD), Yueqing County was still affiliated with Wenzhou Mansion, the administrative bureau of Zhejiang Province. After the outbreak of the Revolution of 1911, Wenzhou established a military and political branch, and Yueqing belonged to it. In July of the first year of the Republic of China (AD 1912), the Wenzhou Military and Political Branch was abolished, and Yueqing was directly under Zhejiang Province. In May of the third year of the Republic of China (AD 1914), Ouhai Road was established under the jurisdiction of the former Wenzhou Road, and Yueqing County was under Ouhai Road.

=== Modern (1919-1948) ===
In the sixteenth year of the Republic of China (AD 1927), the system of abolition of Taoism was established, and Yueqing County was under the direct control of Zhejiang Province. In the 21st year of the Republic of China (AD 1932), the 10th County Political Inspectorate District of Zhejiang Province was established in Wenzhou, and Yueqing was subordinate to it. In the 22nd year of the Republic of China (AD 1933), the 10th County Political Inspectorate District of Zhejiang Province was renamed the Fourth Special Zone and the Third Special Zone, and Yueqing belonged to it. In the twenty-third year of the Republic of China (AD 1934), it was called the eighth administrative inspectorate district, and Yueqing belonged to it. In the thirty-seventh year of the Republic of China (1948 AD), it was called the fifth administrative inspectorate district, and Yueqing belonged to it.

=== Contemporary (1949–present) ===
In May 1949, Yueqing County was liberated and belonged to the Fifth Special Zone of Zhejiang Province. In October, the fifth zone was renamed the Wenzhou zone, and Yueqing County belonged to it. In 1968, the Wenzhou area was changed to the Wenzhou area, and Yueqing County belonged to it. In September 1981, Wenzhou prefectures and cities were merged and called Wenzhou City. The county-level system of municipal administration was implemented, and Yueqing County was under the jurisdiction of Wenzhou City. On September 18, 1993, with the approval of the State Council, the Ministry of Civil Affairs restored the Zhejiang Provincial People's Government and agreed to revoke Yueqing County and set up Yueqing City (county level) under the direct jurisdiction of the province. On October 7, 1993, the Zhejiang Provincial People's Government entrusted the administrative management of Yueqing City to the Wenzhou Municipal People's Government.

== Climate ==
Climate data for Yueqing, elevation 61 m (200 ft), (1991−2020 normals, extremes 1981−2010)
Month	Jan	Feb	Mar	Apr	May	Jun	Jul	Aug	Sep	Oct	Nov	Dec	Year
Record high °C (°F)	25.8 (78.4)	25.4 (77.7)	28.3 (82.9)	30.3 (86.5)	32.7 (90.9)	34.6 (94.3)	38.3 (100.9)	38.4 (101.1)	38.0 (100.4)	34.2 (93.6)	28.8 (83.8)	25.9 (78.6)	38.4 (101.1)
Mean daily maximum °C (°F)	12.1 (53.8)	13.0 (55.4)	15.9 (60.6)	20.7 (69.3)	24.9 (76.8)	27.9 (82.2)	31.5 (88.7)	31.6 (88.9)	29.1 (84.4)	25.0 (77.0)	20.2 (68.4)	14.8 (58.6)	22.2 (72.0)
Daily mean °C (°F)	8.4 (47.1)	9.2 (48.6)	12.1 (53.8)	16.8 (62.2)	21.4 (70.5)	24.9 (76.8)	28.3 (82.9)	28.4 (83.1)	25.7 (78.3)	21.3 (70.3)	16.4 (61.5)	10.9 (51.6)	18.7 (65.6)
Mean daily minimum °C (°F)	5.5 (41.9)	6.4 (43.5)	9.3 (48.7)	13.8 (56.8)	18.6 (65.5)	22.5 (72.5)	25.8 (78.4)	25.7 (78.3)	22.7 (72.9)	17.8 (64.0)	13.1 (55.6)	7.6 (45.7)	15.7 (60.3)
Record low °C (°F)	−5.1 (22.8)	−4.9 (23.2)	−2.3 (27.9)	0.4 (32.7)	9.4 (48.9)	13.6 (56.5)	18.4 (65.1)	19.2 (66.6)	13.0 (55.4)	3.9 (39.0)	−1.3 (29.7)	−5.8 (21.6)	−5.8 (21.6)
Average precipitation mm (inches)	58.4 (2.30)	73.2 (2.88)	136.4 (5.37)	123.2 (4.85)	156.3 (6.15)	228.0 (8.98)	156.7 (6.17)	282.7 (11.13)	160.7 (6.33)	58.7 (2.31)	68.5 (2.70)	57.0 (2.24)	1,559.8 (61.41)
Average precipitation days (≥ 0.1 mm)	11.7	13.2	17.3	16.4	16.3	17.7	11.8	15.4	12.1	6.9	10.0	10.0	158.8
Average snowy days	1.1	1.1	0.2	0	0	0	0	0	0	0	0	0.2	2.6
Average relative humidity (%)	73	75	78	79	81	86	82	81	76	70	72	70	77
Mean monthly sunshine hours	101.2	95.6	106.3	122.2	123.6	111.4	208.8	202.5	168.8	172.0	123.3	125.4	1,661.1
Percentage possible sunshine	31	30	29	32	29	27	49	50	46	49	39	39	38
Source: China Meteorological Administration

== Economics ==
Yueqing City has a developed economy and is one of the earliest and most dynamic regions to have joined in China's turn towards a market economy. The southern Liushi area is the capital of China's famous low-voltage electrical appliances, hence making Liushi the electrical capital of the World. It is considered the birthplace of the Wentai model. North of the Hill is one of China's top ten famous mountains, known as the Southeast First Hill, is the first national 5A-class tourist attractions, the "World Geological Park" title.

In June 2017, Yueqing City was named the National Health City. National model county (district) with strong intellectual property rights. In December 2018, it was selected as one of the top 100 counties in China for comprehensive competitiveness, top 100 investment potential, top 100 best commercial cities in mainland China, and top 30 best county-level cities in China. On October 8, 2019, it was selected as the top 100 counties and cities with comprehensive national strength in 2019. Selected as one of the top 100 counties and cities in the nation's new urbanization quality in 2019. 2019 top 100 counties in the nation's business environment. The second batch of counties (districts) with water-saving society construction standards. The pilot units of the whole county promote the quality of the national farmers' cooperatives

Since 1993, Yueqing has entered the ranks of top 100 counties (cities) with comprehensive strength. In 2004, the city's GDP was 25.25 billion yuan, the per capita disposable income of urban residents was 15,945 yuan, the per capita living area was 40.1 square meters, the per capita net income of rural residents was 7,547 yuan, and the per capita living area was 41.8 square meters. The people's living standard reached the level proposed by the Chinese government as the "well-off" standard of living.

== Recent developments ==
The city of Yueqing has transformed since 2000 to a green and more lively city for its inhabitants, two new parks have been introduced, the Central Park and the Qinghe Park South East of the city nearing the Industrial Zone. A large complex off Stadiums open for free to the public and vast complex of cycling roads along the parks and canals make it ideal for fitness and hobbies.

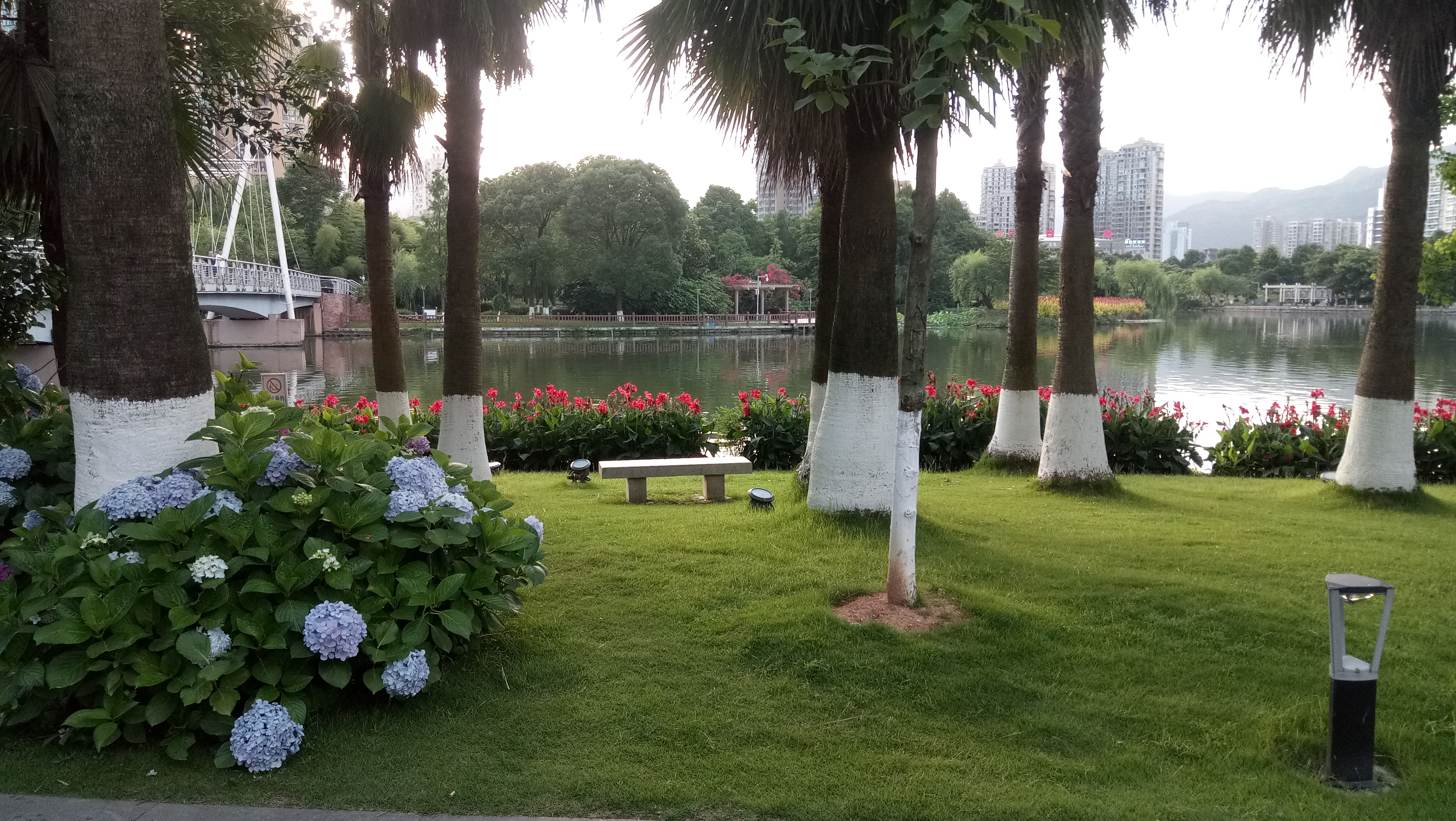
Central Park Yueqing

The Yueqing Sports Centre Stadium is located in the city. The football stadium has a capacity of 15,049.

== Administrative divisions ==
Subdistricts:

- Chengdong Subdistrict (城东街道), Yuecheng Subdistrict (乐成街道), Chengnan Subdistrict (城南街道), Yanpen Subdistrict (盐盆街道), Wengyang Subdistrict (翁垟街道), Baishi Subdistrict (白石街道), Shifan Subdistrict (石帆街道), Tiancheng Subdistrict (天成街道)

Towns:

- Dajing (大荆镇), Xianxi (仙溪镇), Yandang (雁荡镇), Furong (芙蓉镇), Qingjiang (清江镇), Hongqiao (虹桥镇), Danxi (淡溪镇), Liushi (柳市镇), Beibaixiang (北白象镇)

== Sister city ==
- Marysville, Washington, United States

== Transport ==
Ningbo–Taizhou–Wenzhou Railway, a high-speed railway line, runs through Yueqing and has one station in Yueqing. Also the G15 Shenyang–Haikou Expressway passes through Yueqing.

- Yueqing railway station
- Yueqing East railway station
- Oujiang Beikou Bridge

== Gallery ==
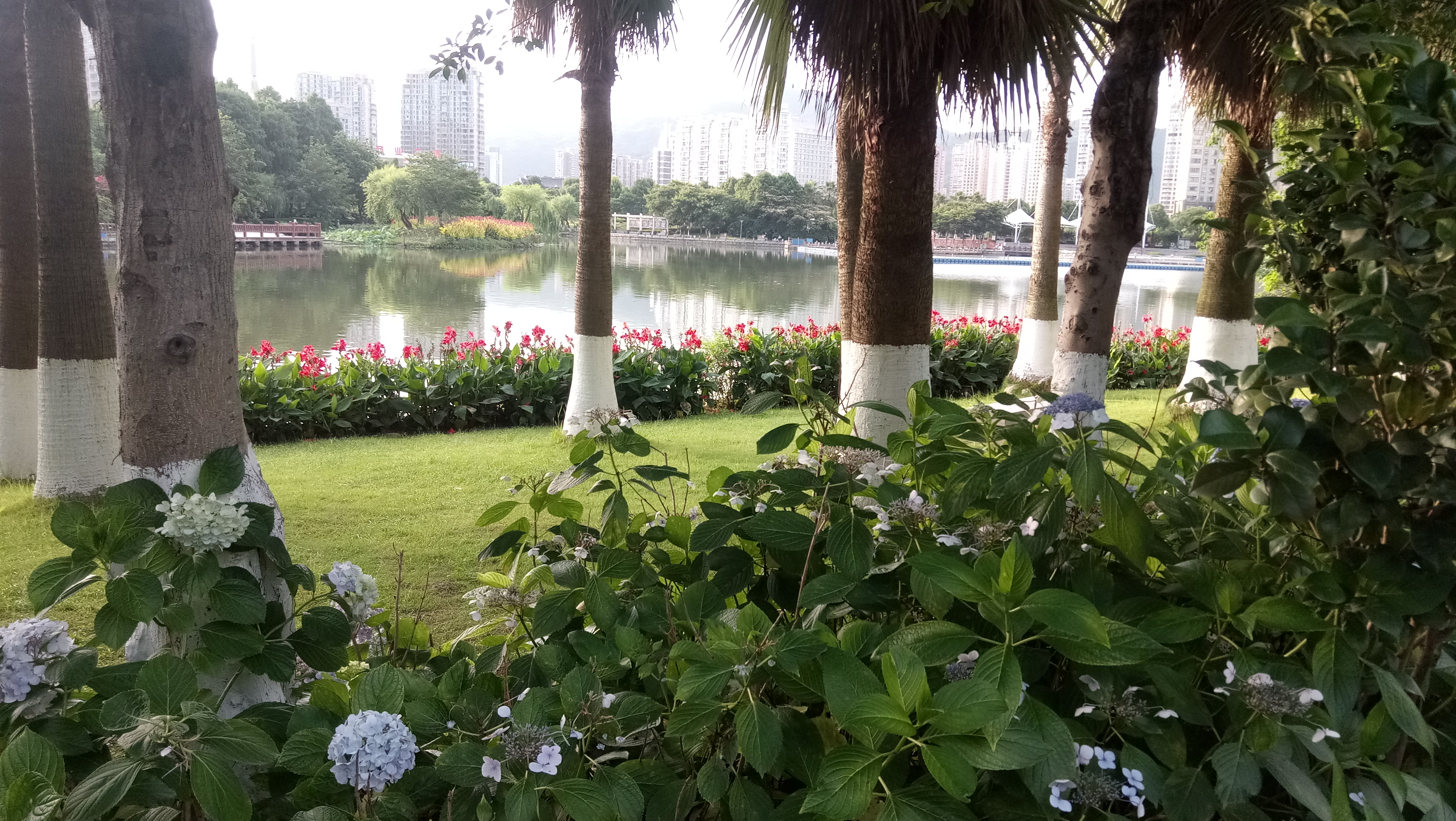
Yueqing Central Park

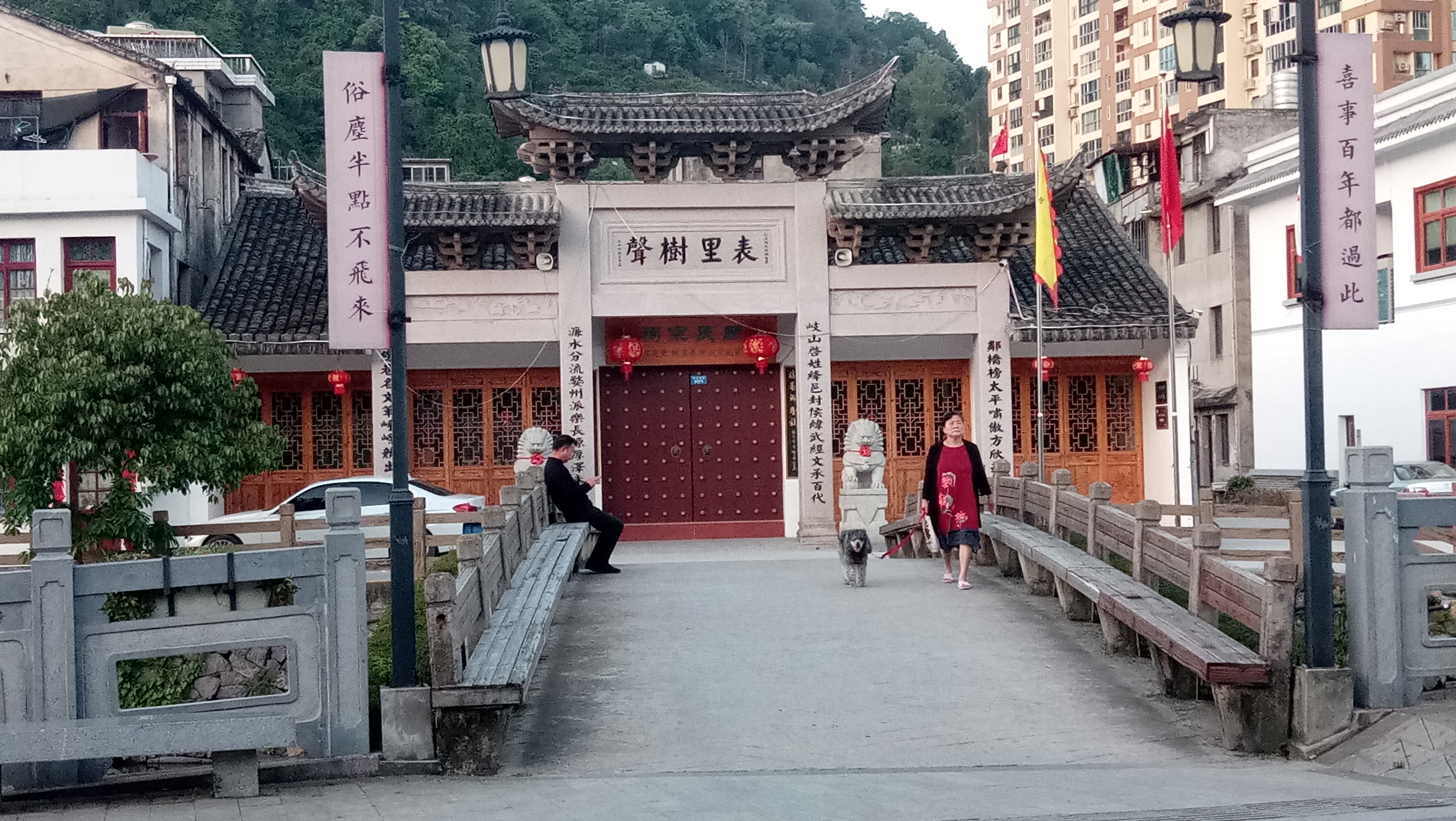
Bridge in old town

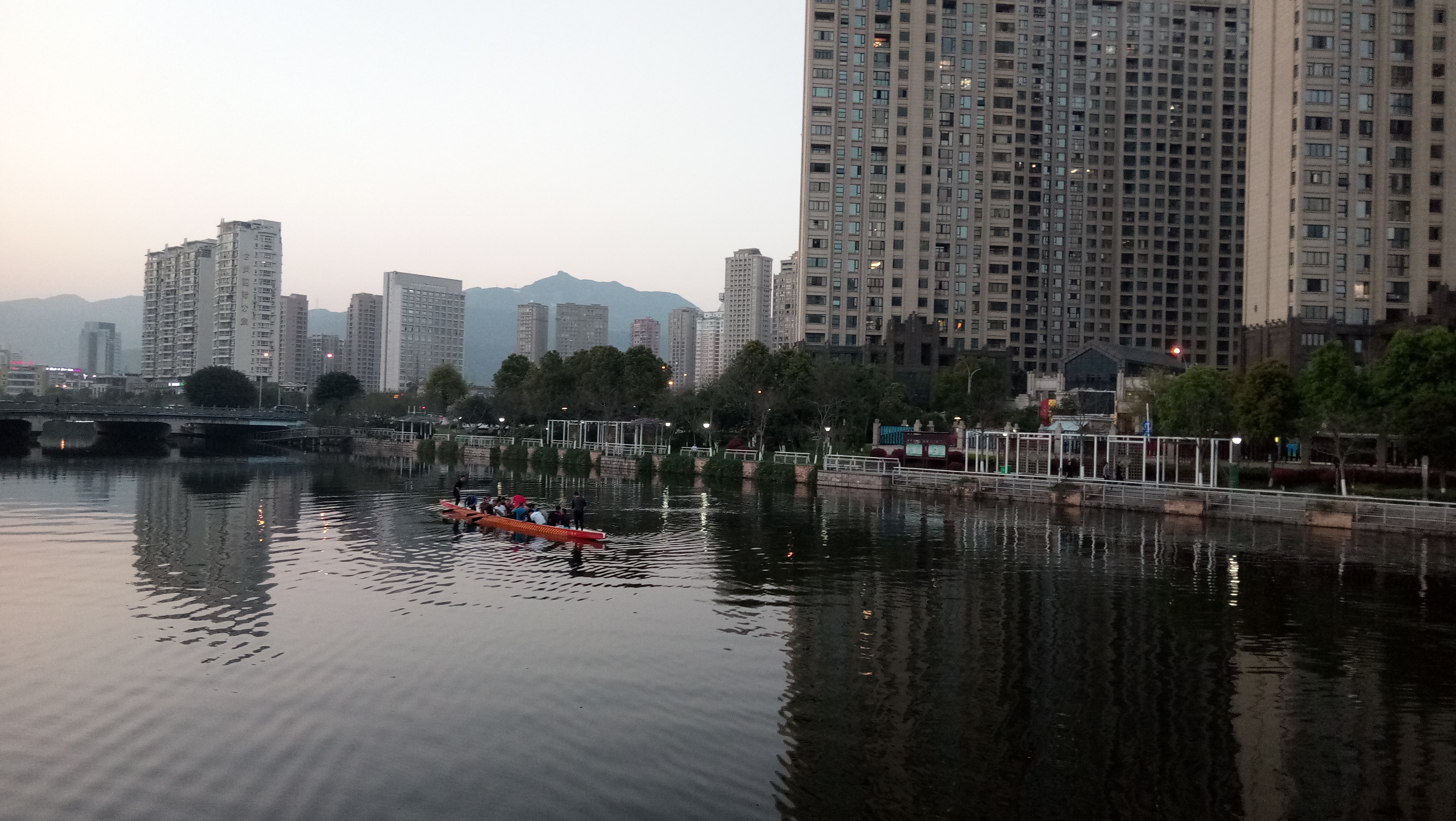
Dragon Boat

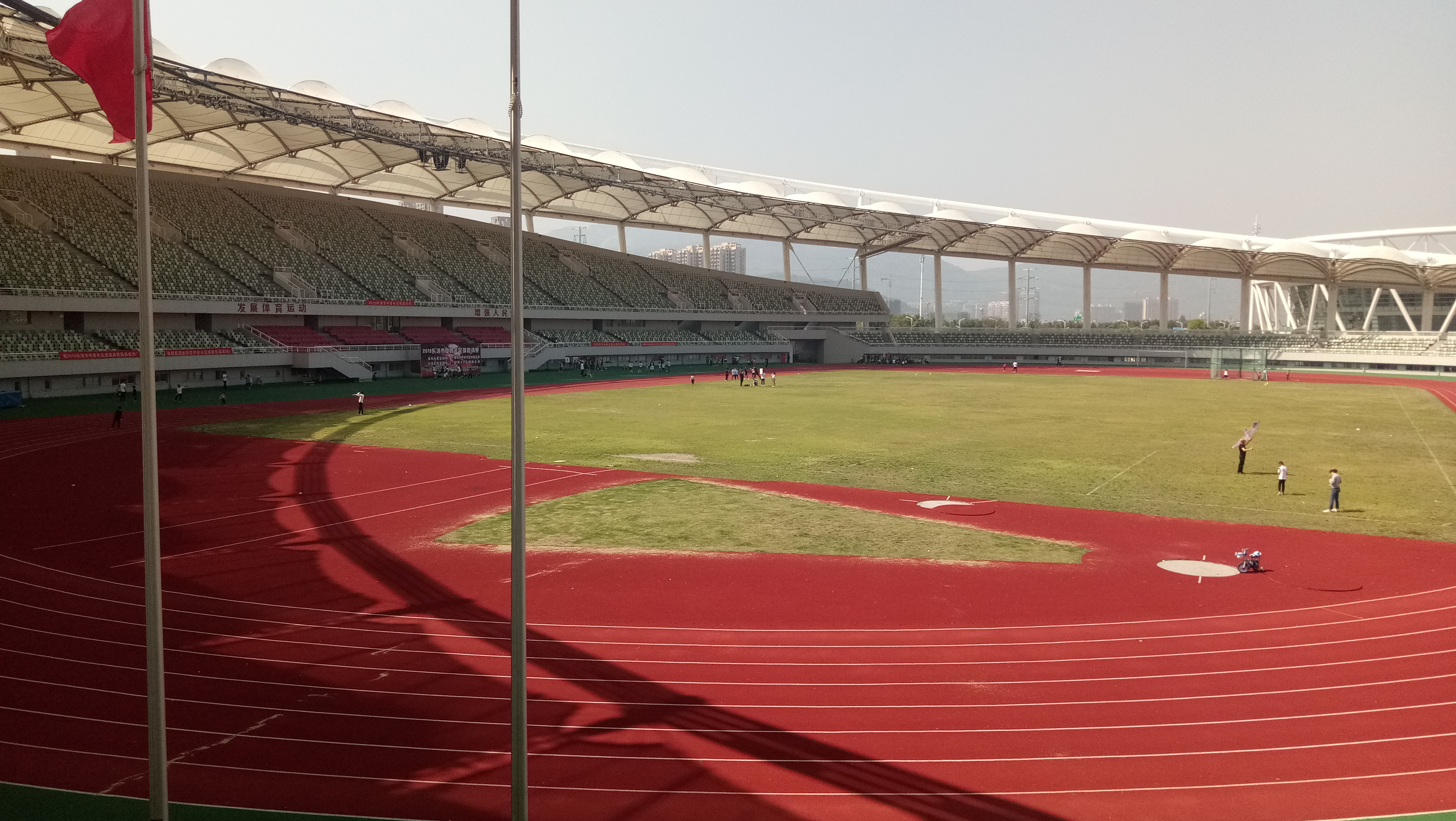
Huayi Electric Stadium

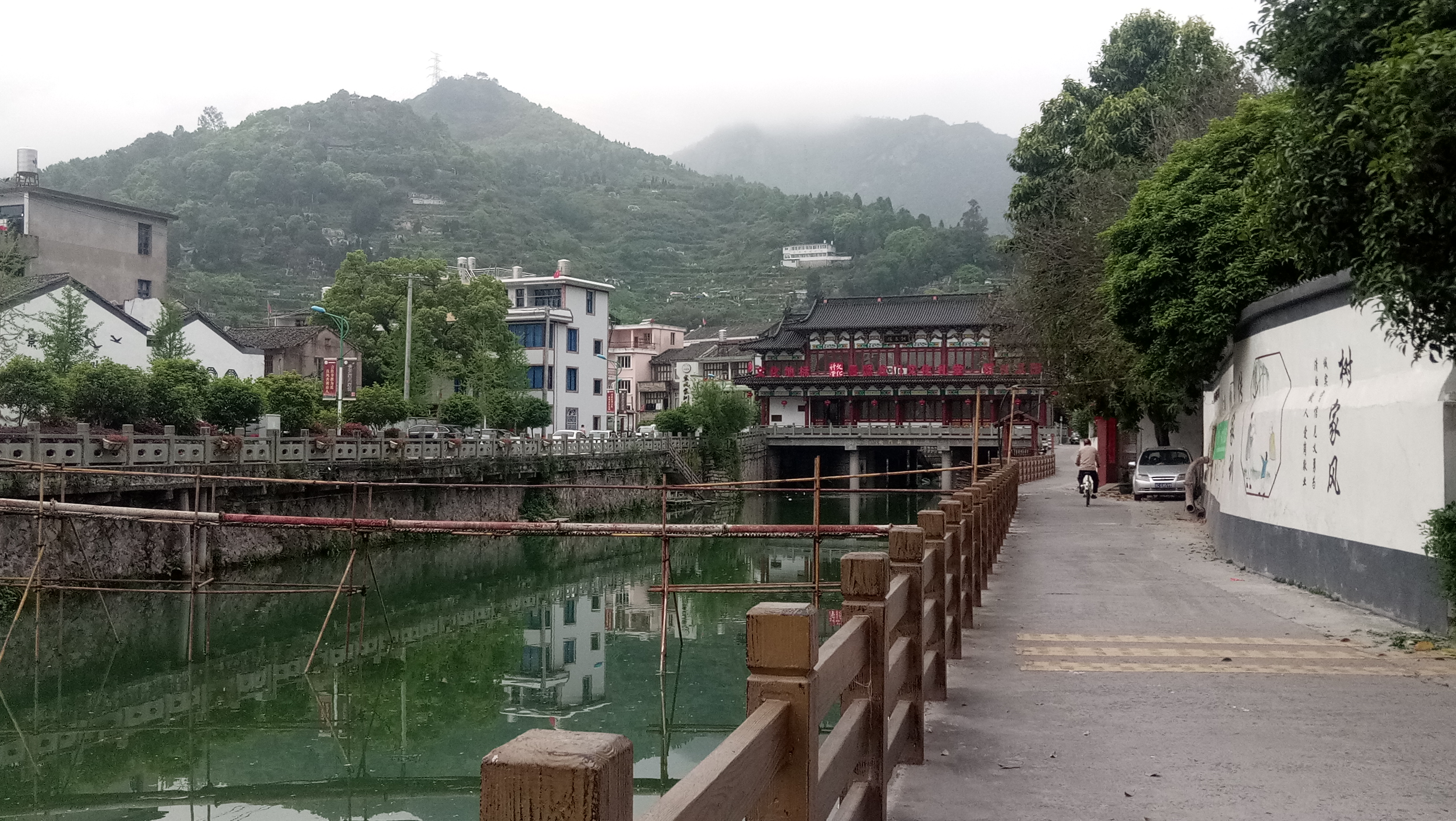
Old bridge in Yueqing old town

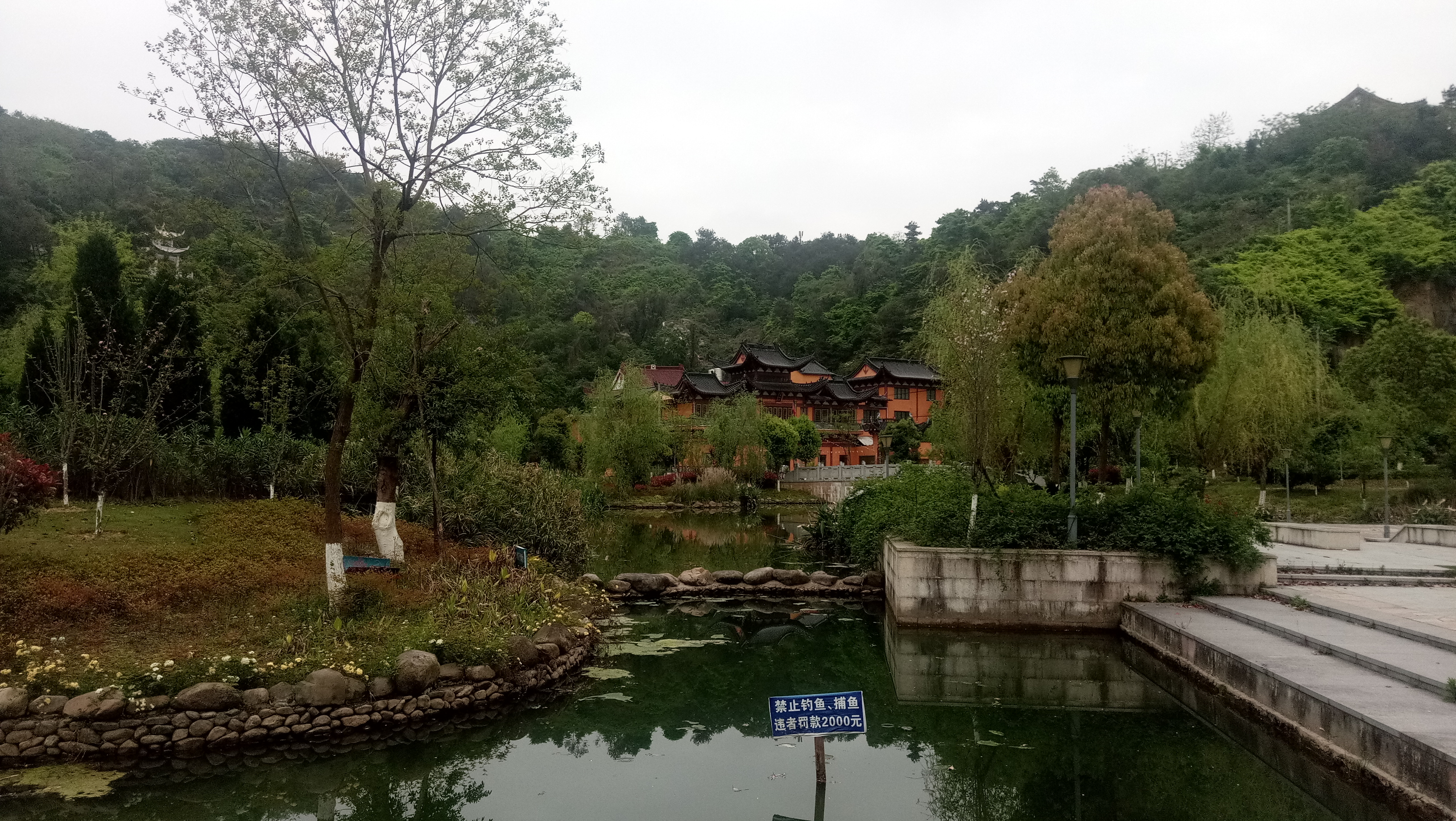
Old temple at centre of town

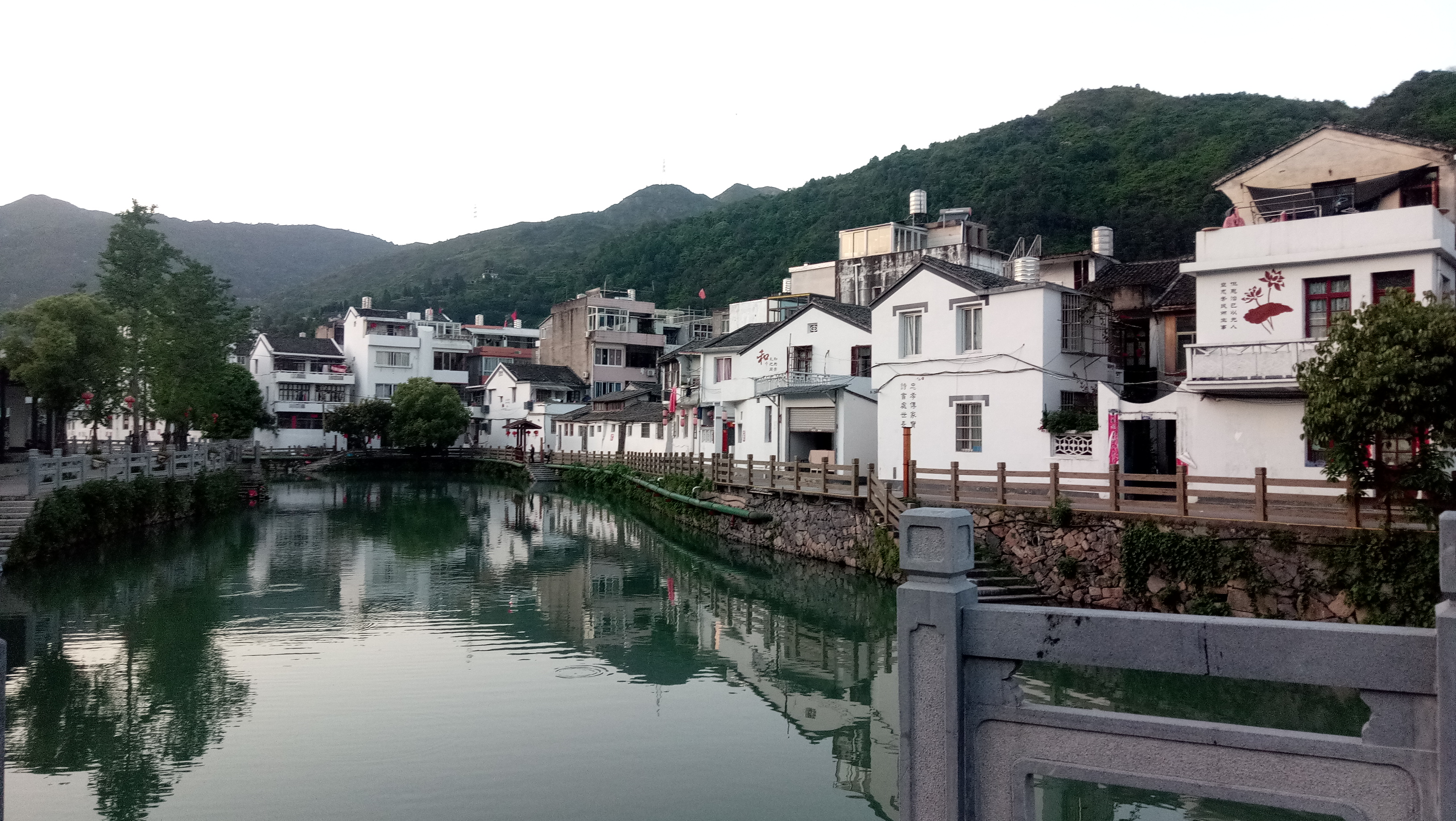
Old town Yueqing white houses

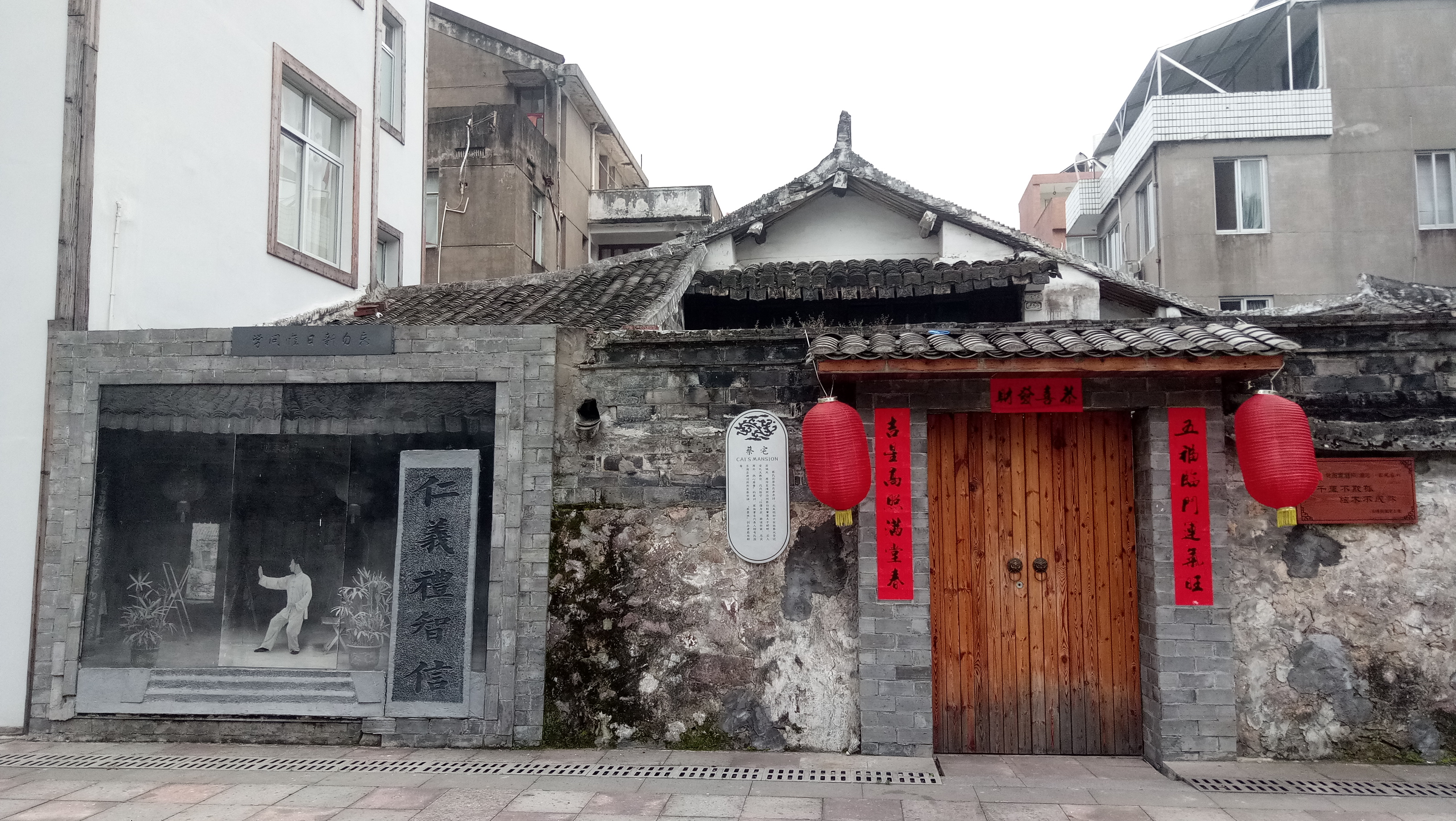
Old Yueqing architecture
