= Minpu Bridge =

Minpu Bridge 闵浦大桥
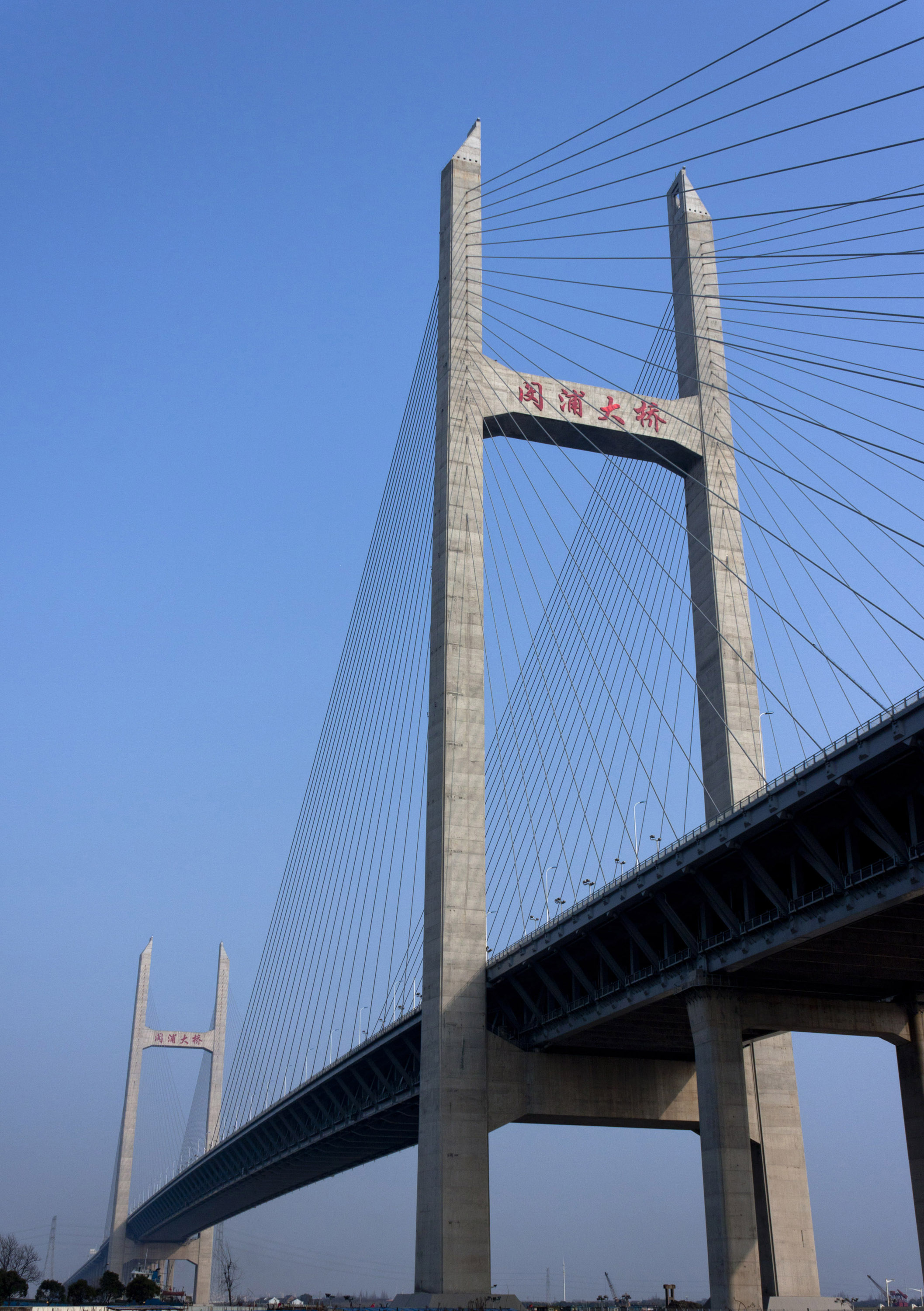
- Coordinates: 31°03′10″N 121°28′37″E
- Carries: 8 lanes of the Shanghai S32 (Shanghai–Jiaxing–Huzhou Expressway) (upper deck); 6 lanes and sidewalks of Fanghe Road (lower deck)
- Crosses: Huangpu River
- Locale: Minhang District, Shanghai, China

Characteristics
- Design: double-deck cable-stayed bridge
- Total length: 3,982.7 m (13,067 ft)
- Width: 43.6 m (143 ft) (upper deck); 27 m (89 ft) (lower deck)
- Height: 210 m (689 ft)
- Longest span: 708 m (2,323 ft)

Location
- Interactive map of Minpu Bridge

The Minpu Bridge (Chinese: 闵浦大桥; Chinese: 閔浦大橋; pinyin: Mǐnpǔ Dàqiáo) is a double-decker cable-stayed bridge over the Huangpu River in Minhang District, Shanghai, China. The bridge is 3,982.7 m (13,067 ft) in length, with a main span of 708 m (2,323 ft) and a height of 214.5 m (704 ft). It opened to traffic on 11 January 2010.

The upper deck of the bridge is 43.8 m (144 ft) wide and carries 8 lanes of the tolled Shanghai–Jiaxing–Huzhou Expressway, an expressway that connects the province of Zhejiang in the west with Shanghai Pudong International Airport to the east. The lower deck of the bridge is 28 m (92 ft) wide and carries Fanghe Road, and is open to road and pedestrian traffic. The bridge was designed by the Shanghai Municipal Engineering Design Institute, Shanghai Urban Construction College, and Shanghai Urban Construction Design Institute, with assistance from Holger Svensson. It was built by the Shanghai Huangpujiang Bridge Engineering Construction Company. It carries two levels of roadway to accommodate more cars and has a stiffening truss to prevent swinging in the city's harsh winds.

== See also ==
- Yangpu Bridge, a cable-stayed bridge across Huangpu River in Shanghai.
- Lupu Bridge, an arch bridge across Huangpu River in Shanghai.
- List of bridges in China
- List of longest cable-stayed bridge spans
- List of tallest bridges
