= Oujiang Beikou Bridge =

Suspension bridge in Wenzhou, China

Oujiang Beikou Bridge 瓯江北口大桥
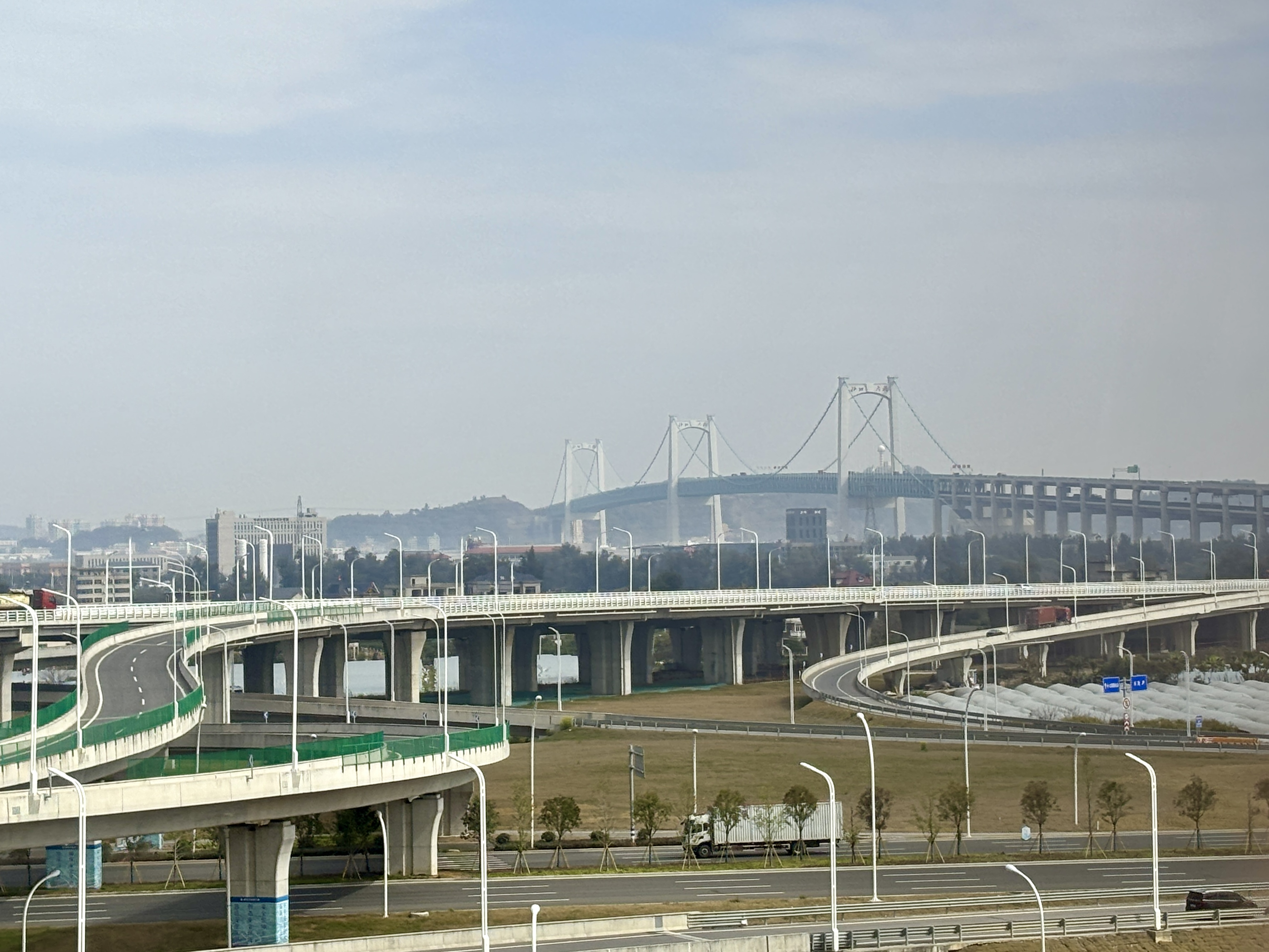
- Coordinates: 27°58′48.94″N 120°55′45.81″E
- Carries: Upper level: G1523 Ningbo–Dongguan Expressway; Lower level: China National Highway 228
- Crosses: Ou River
- Locale: Yueqing and Dongtou District; Wenzhou, Zhejiang, China

Characteristics
- Design: Suspension bridge
- Material: Steel / concrete
- Total length: 7.9 kilometres (4.9 mi)
- Width: Upper level: 33.5 metres (110 ft); Lower level: 33 metres (108 ft)
- Height: 151 metres (495 ft)
- Longest span: 800 metres (2,600 ft)
- No. of spans: 4
- Clearance below: 53.5 metres (176 ft)
- No. of lanes: Upper level: 6 Lower level: 6

History
- Construction start: 30 November 2016
- Construction cost: RMB 8.836 billion
- Opened: Upper level: 27 May 2022; Lower level: 31 August 2022

Location
- Interactive map of Oujiang Beikou Bridge

Oujiang Beikou Bridge (Chinese: 瓯江北口大桥) is a suspension bridge between Yueqing and Dongtou District, Wenzhou City, in Zhejiang Province, China. It is an important part of the Yongguan Expressway and China National Highway 228. It is the world's first three-tower four-span double-decked steel truss suspension bridge. The construction cost was 8.836 billion yuan (2022: ~ US$1.32 billion), and construction started on 30 November 2016. The main bridge was finished on 30 December 2021, and the upper floor was opened to traffic on 27 May 2022，lower floor was opened to traffic on 31 August 2022.

== Design ==
Due to the height limit of the nearby Wenzhou Longwan International Airport, the bridge tower could not be built too high, and if the bridge tower was built too low, it would affect the Ou River, so it was designed as the world's first three-tower four-span suspension bridge. The total length of the project is 7.9 kilometres (4.9 mi). The main bridge is arranged as a span of 215 meters (705 ft), plus the main span of 2 × 800 metres (2,600 ft), plus 275 metres (902 ft). The width of the upper deck is 33.5 metres (110 ft) and the width of the lower deck is 33 metres (108 ft). The headroom under the bridge is 53.5 metres (176 ft) and the bridge height is 151 metres (495 ft). The upper level is a two-way six-lane expressway, and the lower level is a two-way six-lane first-class highway.

== See also ==
- List of longest suspension bridge spans
