= Yangsigang Yangtze River Bridge =

Yangsigang Yangtze River Bridge 杨泗港长江大桥
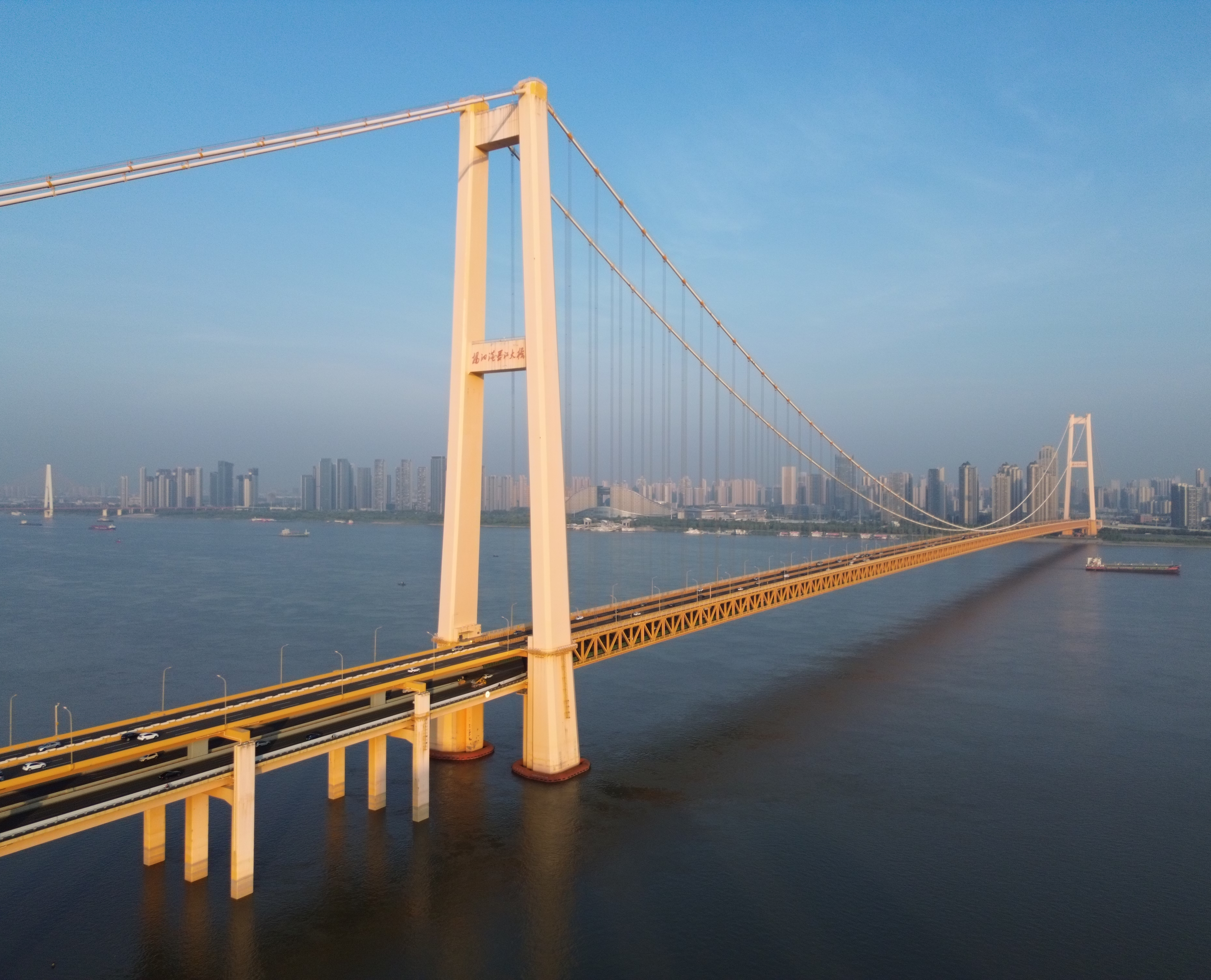
- Coordinates: 30°30′37″N 114°15′24″E
- Carries: Yangsigang Expressway
- Crosses: Yangtze River
- Locale: Hanyang–Wuchang; Wuhan, Hubei, China

Characteristics
- Material: Steel, concrete
- Width: 32.5 m (107 ft)
- Height: 243.9 m (800 ft) (north tower); 231.9 m (761 ft) (south tower)
- Longest span: 1,700 m (5,577 ft)
- No. of lanes: 12

History
- Constructed by: China Railway Major Bridge Engineering Group
- Construction start: July 2015 (Note: The Structurae database lists the construction start date as 2013, while the October 8, 2019 China Daily article gives July 2015.)
- Construction end: September 2019
- Construction cost: CNY ¥8.5 billion (US$1.2 billion)
- Opened: October 8, 2019

Location
- Interactive map of Yangsigang Yangtze River Bridge

Video

The Yangsigang Yangtze River Bridge is a suspension bridge in Wuhan, Hubei, China. It opened to traffic on October 8, 2019, and is the third longest suspension bridge span in the world and overall the longest in China. The bridge spans 1,700 metres (5,577.4 feet; 1.1 miles) across the Yangtze River. The bridge is the longest double-deck bridge span in the world and carries motorized vehicles, non-motorized vehicles, and pedestrians on its two decks. The bridge cost CNY ¥8.5 billion (US$1.27 billion) to build.

The bridge connects the Hanyang and Wuchang districts. The upper deck has six lanes for vehicles which connect to the urban expressway system and 2 m (6.6 ft) wide pedestrian walkways on each side of the bridge. The lower deck includes four more motor vehicle lanes that connect to the city streets, two 2.5 m (8.2 ft) lanes for non-motorized vehicles, and two more pedestrian walkways. The overall length of the bridge is 4.134 kilometres (2.57 miles). (Note: Sources do not agree on the total length of the structure. The article on the Chinese Wikipedia and the Structurae database list the overall length of the bridge as 4,317.8 meters, while the October 8, 2019 China Daily article gives 4.13 km and the Manitowoc Cranes press release gives 4,134 m.)

== Tourism ==
Sometimes in the rain, mist forms making the other side of the Yangtze River invisible, and the area beneath the bridge becomes a minimalist scenic spot.

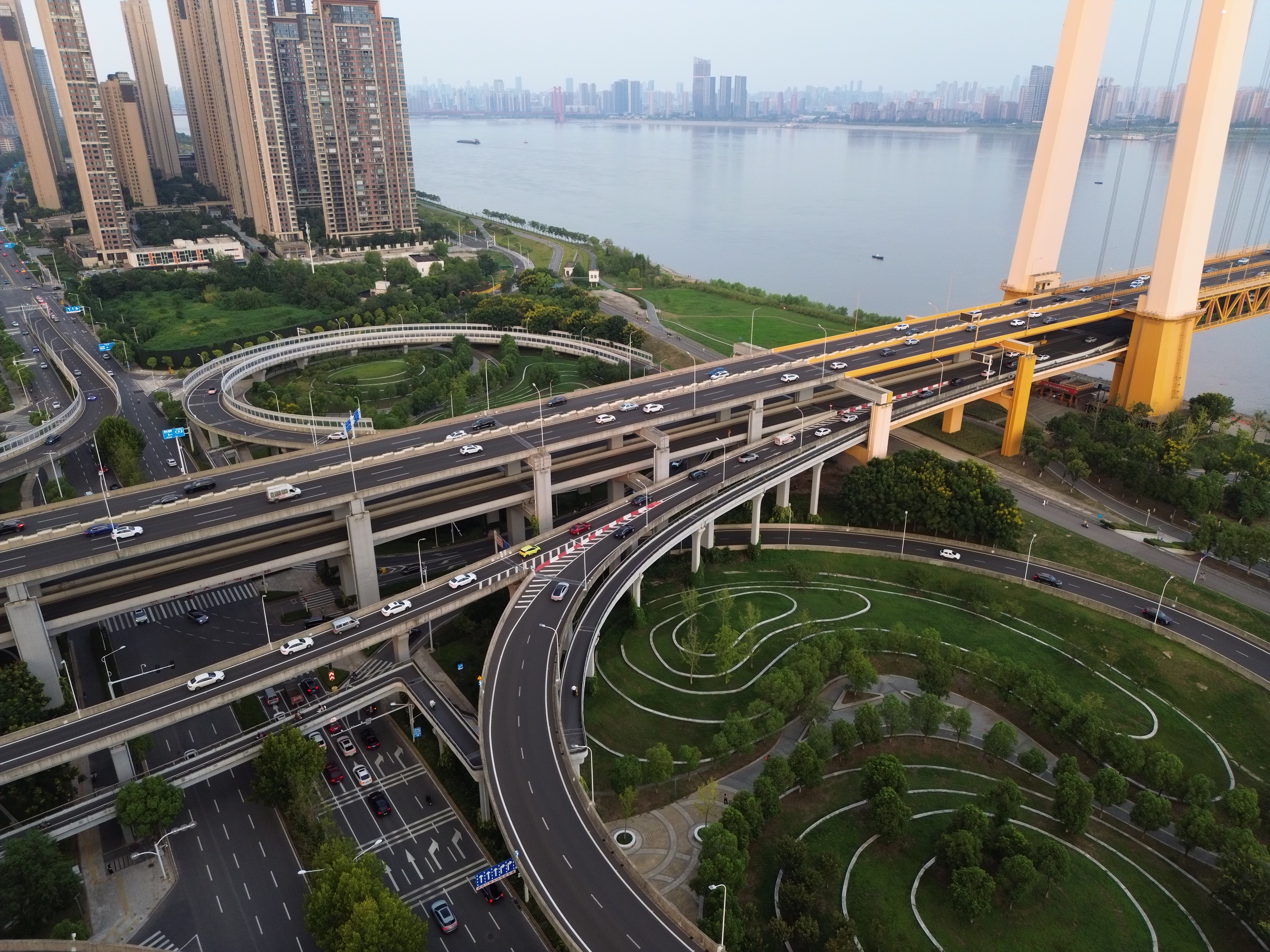

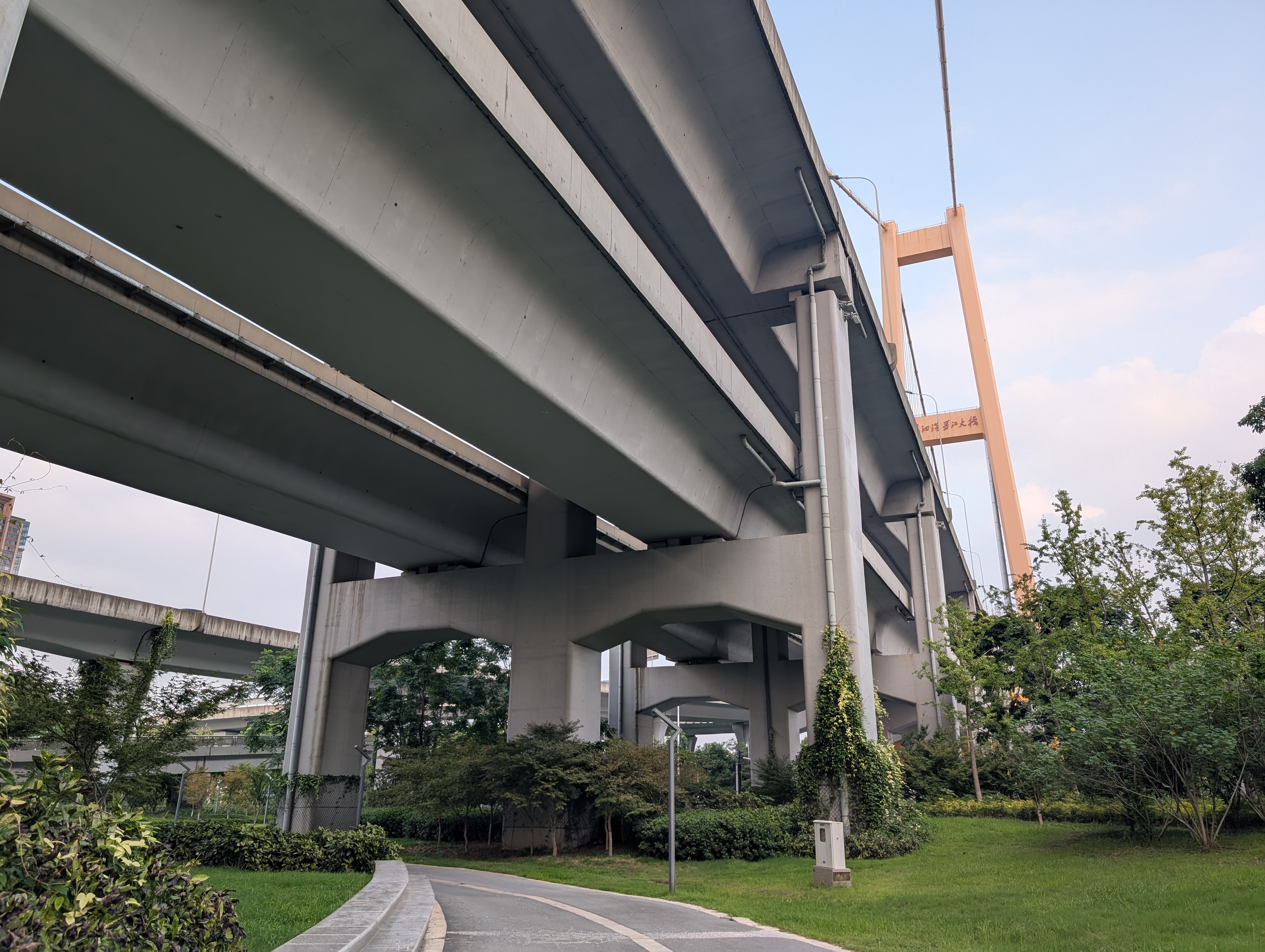

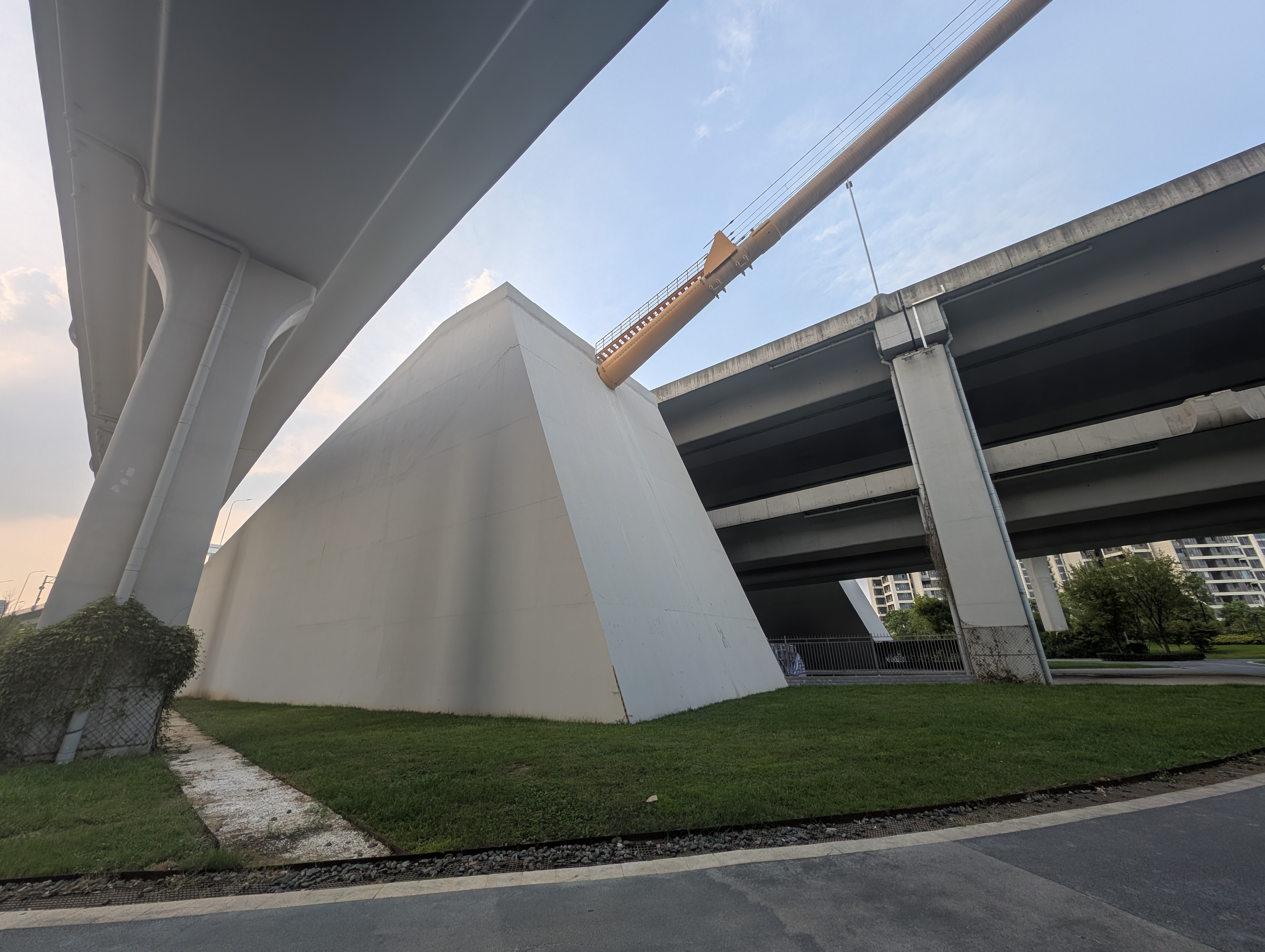

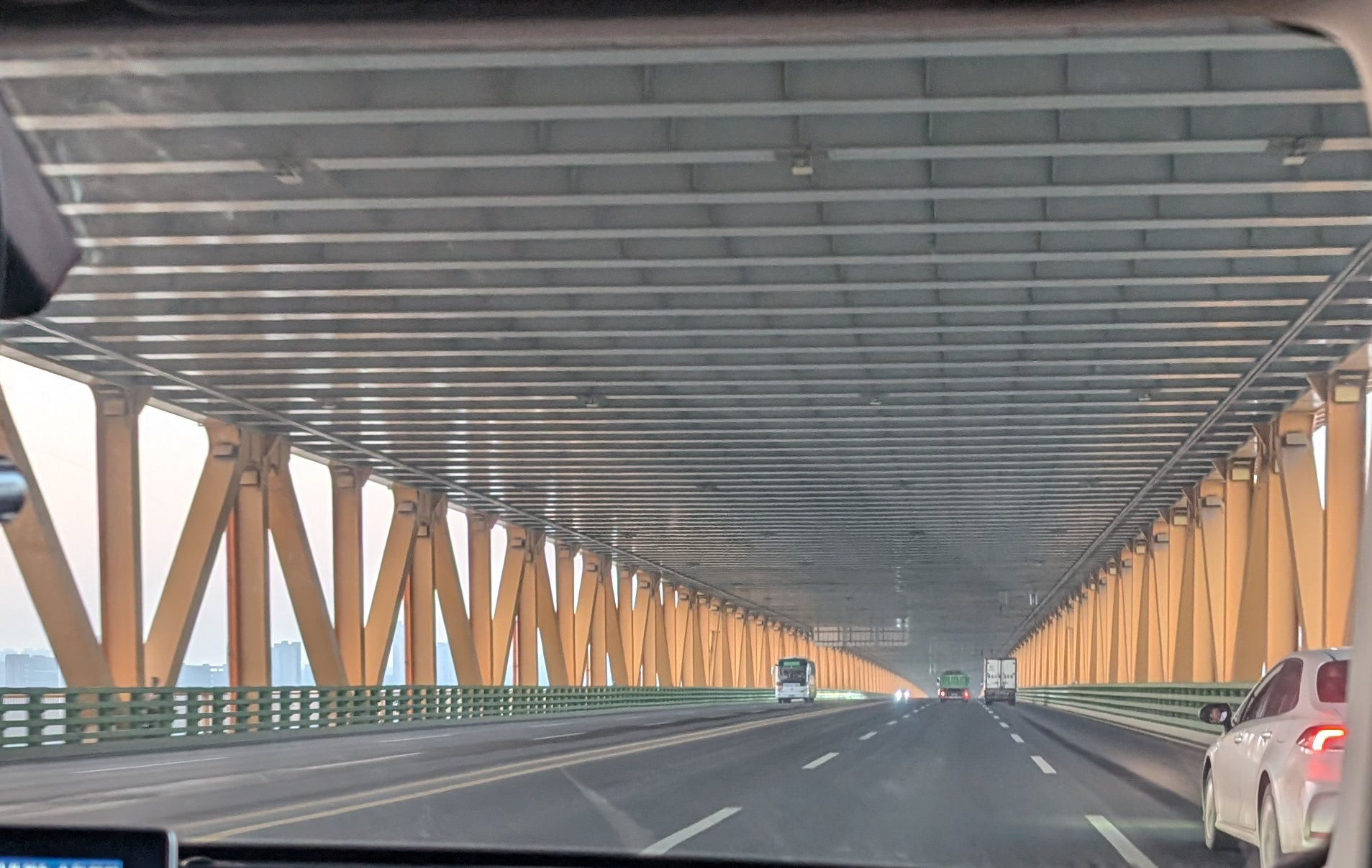

== See also ==
- Bridges and tunnels across the Yangtze River
- List of bridges in China
- List of longest suspension bridge spans
- List of tallest bridges
