= Double-deck bridge =

Bridge with two vertically arranged decks

A double-deck bridge (also double-decker bridge) is a bridge with two decks arranged one above the other. The decks may carry different modes of transport, such as road vehicles and railway trains, separate motor vehicles from pedestrian traffic, or separate streams of the same mode of traffic, such as vehicles travelling in opposite directions. Double-deck designs can increase a bridge's capacity or accommodate traffic where the available space for a crossing is limited.

== Arrangements ==
Double-deck bridges can be designed to separate different modes of transport, directions of travel, or classes of road traffic. The arrangement depends on the purpose of the crossing and the traffic it is intended to accommodate.

=== Multimodal bridges ===
A common arrangement places road traffic on one deck and railway traffic on the other. An early example is the High Level Bridge between Newcastle upon Tyne and Gateshead in England, built between 1845 and 1849, which carries railway traffic on its upper deck and road traffic on the lower deck. The Tsing Ma Bridge in Hong Kong, which was completed in 1997, carries a dual three-lane expressway on its upper deck and two railway tracks on its lower deck. The lower deck also contains two sheltered carriageways used for maintenance access and for diverting traffic during high winds or emergencies.

Other bridges combine road traffic with urban public transport. An example is the Dom Luís I Bridge, constructed between 1881 and 1888 in Porto, whose upper deck currently carries a line of the Porto Metro and whose lower deck accommodates pedestrians, buses, taxis and bicycles.

=== Separation of road traffic ===
Some double-deck bridges carry road traffic on both levels, which separate either opposing directions or different classes of traffic. For example, the western span of the San Francisco–Oakland Bay Bridge in California carries five lanes of westbound traffic on its upper deck and five lanes of eastbound traffic on its lower deck.

The Yangsigang Yangtze River Bridge in Wuhan, China, opened in 2019, also separates road traffic by function. Its upper deck carries a two-way, six-lane urban expressway, while its lower deck carries a two-way, six-lane urban arterial road, along with access for electric vehicles and bicycles.

=== Movable double-deck bridges ===
Some double-deck bridges incorporate movable spans to allow maritime traffic to pass underneath. The Steel Bridge in Portland, Oregon, has been claimed to be the only example of a vertical-lift bridge whose upper and lower decks can be moved independently of one another.

== Design considerations ==
Double-deck bridges must accommodate the loads imposed on both levels. Where road and rail traffic share a structure, engineers must consider the dynamic interaction between vehicles, trains and the bridge, including the effects of vibration on riding comfort. Wind effects can also be important in long-span double-deck bridges, with aerodynamic stability assessed through wind-tunnel testing.

== See also ==
- Bridge deck
- Double-decker bus
- List of multi-level bridges
