= List of presidents of the Institution of Structural Engineers =

This is a list of presidents of the Institution of Structural Engineers.

== List of presidents ==
| No. | Years | Name | Ref |
|---|---|---|---|
| 1 | 1908–1910 | Robert Windsor-Clive, 1st Earl of Plymouth | |
| 2 | 1910–1912 | Henry Tanner | |
| 3 | 1912–1914 | Edmund Percy Wells | |
| 4 | 1914–1916 | Henry Adams | |
| 5 | 1916–1918 | Francis Wentworth-Sheilds | |
| 6 | 1918–1920 | Herbert Searles-Wood | |
| 7 | 1920–1923 | Ernest Etchells | |
| 8 | 1923–1925 | James Petrie | |
| 9 | 1925–1926 | Charles Ruthen | |
| 10 | 1926–1928 | Henry Deane | |
| 11 | 1928–1930 | J. Mitchell Moncrieff | |
| 12 | 1930–1932 | Reginald Stanger | |
| 13 | 1932–1933 | E. C. P. Monson | |
| 14 | 1933–1934 | Arnold Waters | |
| 15 | 1934–1935 | Ewart Andrews | |
| 16 | 1935–1936 | Oscar Faber | |
| 17 | 1936–1937 | C. H. Fox | |
| 18 | 1937–1938 | Joseph Husband | |
| 19 | 1938–1939 | Henry Schofield Rogers | |
| 20 | 1939–1940 | Percy Black | |
| 21 | 1940 | Murray Buxton | |
| 22 | 1940–1941 | Joseph Fawkner Butler | |
| 23 | 1941–1943 | William Kelly Wallace | |
| 24 | 1943–1944 | Arnold Waters | |
| 25 | 1944–1945 | Gower Pimm | |
| 26 | 1945–1946 | Francis Drury | |
| 27 | 1946–1947 | H. J. Collins | |
| 28 | 1947–1948 | Frederick Snow | |
| 29 | 1948–1949 | Lawson Scott White | |
| 30 | 1949–1950 | Leslie Turner | |
| 31 | 1950–1951 | Joseph Swindlehurst | |
| 32 | 1951–1952 | Walter Andrews | |
| 33 | 1952–1953 | Ernest Granter | |
| 34 | 1953–1954 | R. F. Galbraith | |
| 35 | 1954–1955 | Stanley Hamilton | |
| 36 | 1955–1956 | Stanley Vaughan | |
| 37 | 1956–1957 | John Guthrie Brown | |
| 38 | 1957–1958 | Alfred Pugsley | |
| 39 | 1958–1959 | G. S. McDonald | |
| 40 | 1959–1960 | Lewis Kent | |
| 41 | 1960–1961 | George W. Kirkland | |
| 42 | 1961–1962 | Frank Bullen | |
| 43 | 1962–1963 | E. N. Underwood | |
| 44 | 1963–1964 | F. M. Bowen | |
| 45 | 1964–1965 | Charles Husband | |
| 46 | 1965–1966 | Donald Reid | |
| 47 | 1966–1967 | Denis Matthews | |
| 48 | 1967–1968 | Brian Scruby | |
| 49 | 1968–1969 | A. R. Collins | |
| 50 | 1969–1970 | Charles Bernard Stone | |
| 51 | 1970–1971 | Oleg Kerensky | |
| 52 | 1971–1972 | William George Nicholson Geddes | |
| 53 | 1972–1973 | Kenneth Severn | |
| 54 | 1973–1974 | Leonard Creasy | |
| 55 | 1974–1975 | Derek Dick | |
| 56 | 1975–1976 | Peter Mason | |
| 57 | 1976–1977 | Wilfred Eastwood | |
| 58 | 1977–1978 | Peter Thomas Dunican | |
| 59 | 1978–1979 | Alan Harris | |
| 60 | 1979–1980 | John Anthony Derrington | |
| 61 | 1980–1981 | Michael Horne | |
| 62 | 1981–1982 | Tom Akroyd | |
| 63 | 1982–1983 | Clifford Evans | |
| 64 | 1983–1984 | Roy E. Rowe | |
| 65 | 1984–1985 | Alastair Paterson | |
| 66 | 1985–1986 | David Lee | |
| 67 | 1986–1987 | Edmund Happold | |
| 68 | 1987–1988 | Keith White | |
| 69 | 1988–1989 | Peter Campbell | |
| 70 | 1989–1990 | James Armstrong | |
| 71 | 1990–1991 | David Lazenby | |
| 72 | 1991–1992 | Tony Cusens | |
| 73 | 1992–1993 | Jack Waller | |
| 74 | 1993–1994 | Howard Taylor | |
| 75 | 1994–1995 | Patrick J. Dowling | |
| 76 | 1995–1996 | Brian Simpson | |
| 77 | 1996–1997 | Brian Clancy | |
| 78 | 1997–1998 | Sam Thorburn | |
| 79 | 1998–1999 | Leslie Clark | |
| 80 | 1999–2000 | John Roberts | |
| 81 | 2000–2001 | John Allan Hill | |
| 82 | 2001–2002 | David Blockley | |
| 83 | 2002–2003 | Robert McKittrick | |
| 84 | 2003–2004 | David A. Nethercot | |
| 85 | 2004–2005 | Mike Fordyce | |
| 86 | 2005–2006 | Michael Dickson | |
| 87 | 2006–2007 | David Harvey | |
| 88 | 2007–2008 | Sarah Buck | |
| 89 | 2009 | Graham Owens | |
| 90 | 2010 | Norman Train | |
| 91 | 2011 | Roger Plank | |
| 92 | 2012 | John Nolan | |
| 93 | 2013 | Yan-Kee Cheng | |
| 94 | 2014 | Nick Russell | |
| 95 | 2015 | Tim Ibell | |
| 96 | 2016 | Alan Crossman | |
| 97 | 2017 | Ian Firth | |
| 98 | 2018 | Faith Wainwright | |
| 99 | 2019 | Joe Kindregan | |
| 100 | 2020–2021 | Donald McQuillan | |
| 101 | 2022 | Jane Entwistle | |
| 102 | 2023 | Matt Byatt | |
| 103 | 2024 | Tanya de Hoog | |
| 104 | 2025 | Mohamad Al-Dah | |
| 105 | 2026 | Brian Uy | |
