= Lists of presidents =

The following lists of presidents are available:

== Cross-national lists ==
- List of current heads of state and government

=== By age ===
- List of presidents of Latvia by age
- List of Nigerian heads of state by age
- List of South African presidents by age
- List of presidents of the United States by age
- List of presidents of South Korea by age

=== By time in office ===
- List of presidents of Brazil by time in office
- List of presidents of Finland by time in office
- List of presidents of France by tenure
- List of presidents of Romania by time in office
- List of presidents of the Philippines by time in office
- List of presidents of South Korea by time in office
- List of presidents of the United States by time in office

== Supra-national organisations ==
- Central American Parliament
- Council of Europe
- Economic Community of West African States Commission
- European Union institutions
  - European Central Bank
  - European Commission
  - European Court of Justice
  - European Investment Bank
- International Olympic Committee
- Pan-African Parliament
- Union of South American Nations
- United Nations General Assembly
- United Nations Security Council

== UN member countries ==
- Afghanistan
- Albania
- Algeria
- Angola
- Argentina
- Armenia
- Austria
- Azerbaijan
- Bangladesh
- Belarus
- Benin
- Bolivia
- Bosnia and Herzegovina
- Botswana
- Brazil
- Bulgaria
- Burkina Faso
- Burundi
- Cameroon
- Cape Verde
- Central African Republic
- Chad
- Chile
- China
- Colombia
- Comoros
- Congo, Democratic Republic of the
- Congo, Republic of the
- Costa Rica
- Côte d'Ivoire
- Croatia
- Cuba
- Cyprus
- Czech Republic
- Djibouti
- Dominica
- Dominican Republic
- East Timor
- Ecuador
- Egypt
- El Salvador
- Equatorial Guinea
- Eritrea
- Estonia
- Ethiopia
- Fiji
- Finland
- France
- Gabon
- The Gambia
- Georgia
- Germany
- Ghana
- Greece
- Guatemala
- Guinea
- Guinea-Bissau
- Guyana
- Haiti
- Honduras
- Hungary
- Iceland
- India
- Indonesia
- Iran
- Iraq
- Ireland
- Israel
- Italy
- Kazakhstan
- Kenya
- Kiribati
- Korea, North
- Korea, South
- Kyrgyzstan
- Laos
- Latvia
- Lebanon
- Liberia
- Lithuania
- Madagascar
- Malawi
- Maldives
- Mali
- Malta
- Marshall Islands
- Mauritania
- Mauritius
- Mexico
- Micronesia, Federated States of
- Moldova
- Mongolia
- Montenegro
- Mozambique
- Namibia
- Nauru
- Nepal
- Nicaragua
- Niger
- Nigeria
- North Macedonia
- Pakistan
- Palau
- Panama
- Paraguay
- Peru
- Philippines
- Poland
- Portugal
- Romania
- Russian Federation
- Rwanda
- San Marino
- São Tomé and Príncipe
- Senegal
- Serbia
- Seychelles
- Sierra Leone
- Singapore
- Slovakia
- Slovenia
- Somalia
- South Africa:
  - South Africa (1961–1994)
  - South Africa (1994–present)
- South Sudan
- Sri Lanka
- Sudan
- Suriname
- Switzerland
- Syria
- Tajikistan
- Tanzania
  - Zanzibar
- Togo
- Trinidad and Tobago
- Tunisia
- Turkey
- Uganda
- Ukraine
- United States
- Uruguay
- Uzbekistan
- Vanuatu
- Venezuela
- Vietnam
- Yemen
- Zambia
- Zimbabwe

== Former states ==
- Biafra
- Confederate States of America
- Czechoslovakia
- Ichkeria, Chechen Republic of
- Orange Free State
- Republic of the Rio Grande
- Rhodesia
- Spain, Second Republic of (Republican Spain)
- South Yemen
- Soviet Union
- Tanganyika
- Texas, Republic of
- Yucatán, Republic of
- Yugoslavia
- Zimbabwe Rhodesia

== Other states ==
- Abkhazia
- Ambazonia
- Artsakh
- Bougainville
- British Virgin Islands
- China, Republic of (Taiwan)
- Donetsk, People's Republic of
- Guadeloupe
- Kosovo
- Kurdistan
- Luhansk, People's Republic of
- Northern Cyprus
- Sahrawi Arab Democratic Republic
- Somaliland
- South Ossetia
- Palestine, State of
- Transnistria

== Other organisations ==
- American Statistical Association
- British Computer Society
- College of William & Mary
- FIFA
- Geological Society of London
- Institute of Structural Engineers
- Institution of Civil Engineers
- Institution of Electrical Engineers
- Institution of Mathematical Statistics
- National Organization for Women
- Royal College of Physicians
- Royal College of Physicians of Edinburgh
- Royal College of Surgeons of Edinburgh
- Royal Society of Medicine
- Royal Society
- Royal Statistical Society
- University of Central Florida
- University of South Carolina

== See also ==
- Fictional presidents
  - Lists of fictional presidents of the United States
