= List of presidents of the United States by time in office =

| Longest presidency | Shortest presidency |
|---|---|
| Franklin D. Roosevelt; 4,422 days (1933–1945) | William Henry Harrison; 31 days (1841) |

The length of a full four-year term of office for a president of the United States usually amounts to 1,461 days (three common years of 365 days plus one leap year of 366 days). The listed number of days is calculated as the difference between dates, which counts the number of calendar days except the first day (day zero). If the first day were included, all numbers would be one day more, except Grover Cleveland would have two more days, as he served two full nonconsecutive terms. (Note: Of years evenly divisible by 100, only those also evenly divisible by 400 are leap years. The years 1800 and 1900 are divisible by 100, but not by 400. John Adams's term and William McKinley's first term did not include a 366-day leap year, so those terms were one day shorter than a normal full term. The year 2000, being divisible by 400, had 366 days, thus Bill Clinton's second term was not shorter than his first.)

Of the individuals elected president, four died of natural causes while in office (William Henry Harrison, Zachary Taylor, Warren G. Harding, and Franklin D. Roosevelt), four were assassinated (Abraham Lincoln, James A. Garfield, William McKinley, and John F. Kennedy), and one resigned from office (Richard Nixon).

William Henry Harrison spent the shortest time in office, while Franklin D. Roosevelt spent the longest. Roosevelt is the only American president to have served more than two terms. Following ratification of the Twenty-second Amendment in 1951, presidents—beginning with Dwight D. Eisenhower—have been ineligible for election to a third term or, after serving more than two years of a term to which some other person was elected president, to a second term. The amendment contained a grandfather clause that explicitly exempted the incumbent president, then Harry S. Truman, from the new term limitation.

While there have been 47 presidencies in the nation's history, only 45 people have been sworn into office; Grover Cleveland and Donald Trump were elected to two nonconsecutive terms.

== Presidents by time in office ==
| Rank | President | Length in days | Order of presidency | Number of terms |
|---|---|---|---|---|
| 1 | Franklin D. Roosevelt | 4,422 (Note: The Twentieth Amendment (ratified in 1933) moved Inauguration Day from March 4 to January 20. The 1937 presidential inauguration was the first to take place on the new date. As a result, Franklin D. Roosevelt's first term in office (1933–1937) was only 1,418 days long, 1 month and 12 days shorter than a normal term.) | 32nd • March 4, 1933 – April 12, 1945 (Note: Died in office) | Three full terms; died 2 months and 23 days into fourth term |
| 2 tie | Thomas Jefferson | 2,922 | 3rd • March 4, 1801 – March 4, 1809 | Two full terms |
| 2 tie | James Madison | 2,922 | 4th • March 4, 1809 – March 4, 1817 | Two full terms |
| 2 tie | James Monroe | 2,922 | 5th • March 4, 1817 – March 4, 1825 | Two full terms |
| 2 tie | Andrew Jackson | 2,922 | 7th • March 4, 1829 – March 4, 1837 | Two full terms |
| 2 tie | Ulysses S. Grant | 2,922 | 18th • March 4, 1869 – March 4, 1877 | Two full terms (Note: Did not seek re-election in 1876. He sought a nonconsecutive third term in 1880, but was defeated for renomination at the Republican National Convention.) |
| 2 tie | Grover Cleveland | 2,922 (Note: Each of Grover Cleveland's two non-consecutive terms in office was 1,461 days long.) | 22nd • March 4, 1885 – March 4, 1889; 24th • March 4, 1893 – March 4, 1897 | Two full terms (nonconsecutive) (Note: Incumbent president who was defeated for a second consecutive full term, but would win a second nonconsecutive term in a later presidential election.) |
| 2 tie | Woodrow Wilson | 2,922 | 28th • March 4, 1913 – March 4, 1921 | Two full terms |
| 2 tie | Dwight D. Eisenhower | 2,922 | 34th • January 20, 1953 – January 20, 1961 | Two full terms |
| 2 tie | Ronald Reagan | 2,922 | 40th • January 20, 1981 – January 20, 1989 | Two full terms |
| 2 tie | Bill Clinton | 2,922 | 42nd • January 20, 1993 – January 20, 2001 | Two full terms |
| 2 tie | George W. Bush | 2,922 | 43rd • January 20, 2001 – January 20, 2009 | Two full terms |
| 2 tie | Barack Obama | 2,922 | 44th • January 20, 2009 – January 20, 2017 | Two full terms |
| 14 | George Washington | 2,865 (Note: Due to logistical delays, George Washington's first term began 1 month and 26 days after the scheduled start of operations of the new government under the Constitution. As a result, the term was only 1,404 days long.) | 1st • April 30, 1789 – March 4, 1797 | Two full terms |
| 15 | Harry S. Truman | 2,840 | 33rd • April 12, 1945 (Note: Succeeded to presidency.) – January 20, 1953 | Succeeded to one partial term (3 years, 9 months, and 8 days), followed by one full term (Note: Initially sought election to an additional consecutive term but withdrew his bid.) |
| 16 | Theodore Roosevelt | 2,728 | 26th • September 14, 1901 – March 4, 1909 | Succeeded to one partial term (3 years, 5 months, and 18 days), followed by one full term (Note: Did not seek re-election in 1908. In 1912, he ran for a nonconsecutive second full term, this time on the Progressive Party ticket, but was defeated.) |
| 17 | Donald Trump | 2,122 (Note: Donald Trump′s non-consecutive first term in office was 1,461 days.) (Note: As of November 12, 2026) | 45th • January 20, 2017 – January 20, 2021; 47th • January 20, 2025 – Present | One full term, currently serving second (nonconsecutive) term |
| 18 | Calvin Coolidge | 2,041 | 30th • August 2, 1923 – March 4, 1929 | Succeeded to one partial term (1 year, 7 months, and 2 days), followed by one full term |
| 19 | Richard Nixon | 2,027 | 37th • January 20, 1969 – August 9, 1974 (Note: Resigned from office) | One full term; resigned 1 year, 6 months, and 20 days into second term |
| 20 | Lyndon B. Johnson | 1,886 | 36th • November 22, 1963 – January 20, 1969 | Succeeded to one partial term (1 year, 1 month, and 29 days), followed by one full term |
| 21 | William McKinley | 1,654 | 25th • March 4, 1897 – September 14, 1901 | One full term; assassinated: died 6 months and 10 days into second term, 8 days after being shot |
| 22 | Abraham Lincoln | 1,503 | 16th • March 4, 1861 – April 15, 1865 | One full term; assassinated: died 1 month and 11 days into second term, 1 day after being shot |
| 23 tie | John Quincy Adams | 1,461 | 6th • March 4, 1825 – March 4, 1829 | One full term (Note: Incumbent president who sought a second consecutive full term, but was defeated either for renomination or in a presidential election.) |
| 23 tie | Martin Van Buren | 1,461 | 8th • March 4, 1837 – March 4, 1841 | One full term (Note: Subsequently sought a nonconsecutive second term, first in 1844, but was defeated for renomination at the Democratic National Convention, and then again in 1848 (this time on the Free Soil Party ticket), but was defeated.) |
| 23 tie | James K. Polk | 1,461 | 11th • March 4, 1845 – March 4, 1849 | One full term |
| 23 tie | Franklin Pierce | 1,461 | 14th • March 4, 1853 – March 4, 1857 | One full term |
| 23 tie | James Buchanan | 1,461 | 15th • March 4, 1857 – March 4, 1861 | One full term |
| 23 tie | Rutherford B. Hayes | 1,461 | 19th • March 4, 1877 – March 4, 1881 | One full term |
| 23 tie | Benjamin Harrison | 1,461 | 23rd • March 4, 1889 – March 4, 1893 | One full term |
| 23 tie | William Howard Taft | 1,461 | 27th • March 4, 1909 – March 4, 1913 | One full term |
| 23 tie | Herbert Hoover | 1,461 | 31st • March 4, 1929 – March 4, 1933 | One full term |
| 23 tie | Jimmy Carter | 1,461 | 39th • January 20, 1977 – January 20, 1981 | One full term |
| 23 tie | George H. W. Bush | 1,461 | 41st • January 20, 1989 – January 20, 1993 | One full term |
| 23 tie | Joe Biden | 1,461 | 46th • January 20, 2021 – January 20, 2025 | One full term |
| 35 | John Adams | 1,460 | 2nd • March 4, 1797 – March 4, 1801 | One full term |
| 36 | John Tyler | 1,430 | 10th • April 4, 1841 – March 4, 1845 | Succeeded to one partial term (3 years and 11 months) |
| 37 | Andrew Johnson | 1,419 | 17th • April 15, 1865 – March 4, 1869 | Succeeded to one partial term (3 years, 10 months, and 17 days) |
| 38 | Chester A. Arthur | 1,262 | 21st • September 19, 1881 – March 4, 1885 | Succeeded to one partial term (3 years, 5 months, and 13 days) |
| 39 | John F. Kennedy | 1,036 | 35th • January 20, 1961 – November 22, 1963 | Assassinated: died 2 years, 10 months, and 2 days into term |
| 40 | Millard Fillmore | 969 | 13th • July 9, 1850 – March 4, 1853 | Succeeded to one partial term (2 years, 7 months, and 23 days) (Note: Sought election to a full term twice, first in 1852, but was defeated for renomination at the Whig National Convention, and then again in 1856 on the American (Know Nothing) ticket, but was defeated.) |
| 41 | Gerald Ford | 895 | 38th • August 9, 1974 – January 20, 1977 | Succeeded to one partial term (2 years, 5 months, and 11 days) (Note: Sought election to a full term in 1976, but was defeated.) |
| 42 | Warren G. Harding | 881 | 29th • March 4, 1921 – August 2, 1923 | One partial term; died 2 years, 4 months, and 29 days into term |
| 43 | Zachary Taylor | 492 | 12th • March 4, 1849 – July 9, 1850 | One partial term; died 1 year, 4 months, and 5 days into term |
| 44 | James A. Garfield | 199 | 20th • March 4 – September 19, 1881 | Assassinated: died 6 months and 15 days into term; 79 days after being shot |
| 45 | William Henry Harrison | 31 | 9th • March 4 – April 4, 1841 | One partial term; died 31 days into term |

== See also ==
- List of vice presidents of the United States by time in office
- Lists of presidents by time in office
