= David Harvey (disambiguation) =

David Harvey (born 1935) is a geographer and social theorist.

David Harvey may also refer to:

- David Harvey (footballer) (born 1948), former goalkeeper for Leeds United and Scotland
- David Harvey (luthier), American luthier
- David Harvey (rugby union) (born 1982), Australian rugby union player
- David Harvey (television), television presenter and executive
- David Harvey (paediatrician) (1936–2010), British paediatrician
- David Charles Harvey (1946–2004), English author
- David Archibald Harvey (1845–1916), U.S. House Delegate from Oklahoma Territory
- David Alan Harvey (born 1944), American photographer
- David Harvey (structural engineer) (born 1947), British structural engineer
- D. W. Harvey (David William Harvey, 1887–1938), Canadian engineer
