= Charles W. Fairbanks =

Vice President of the United States from 1905 to 1909

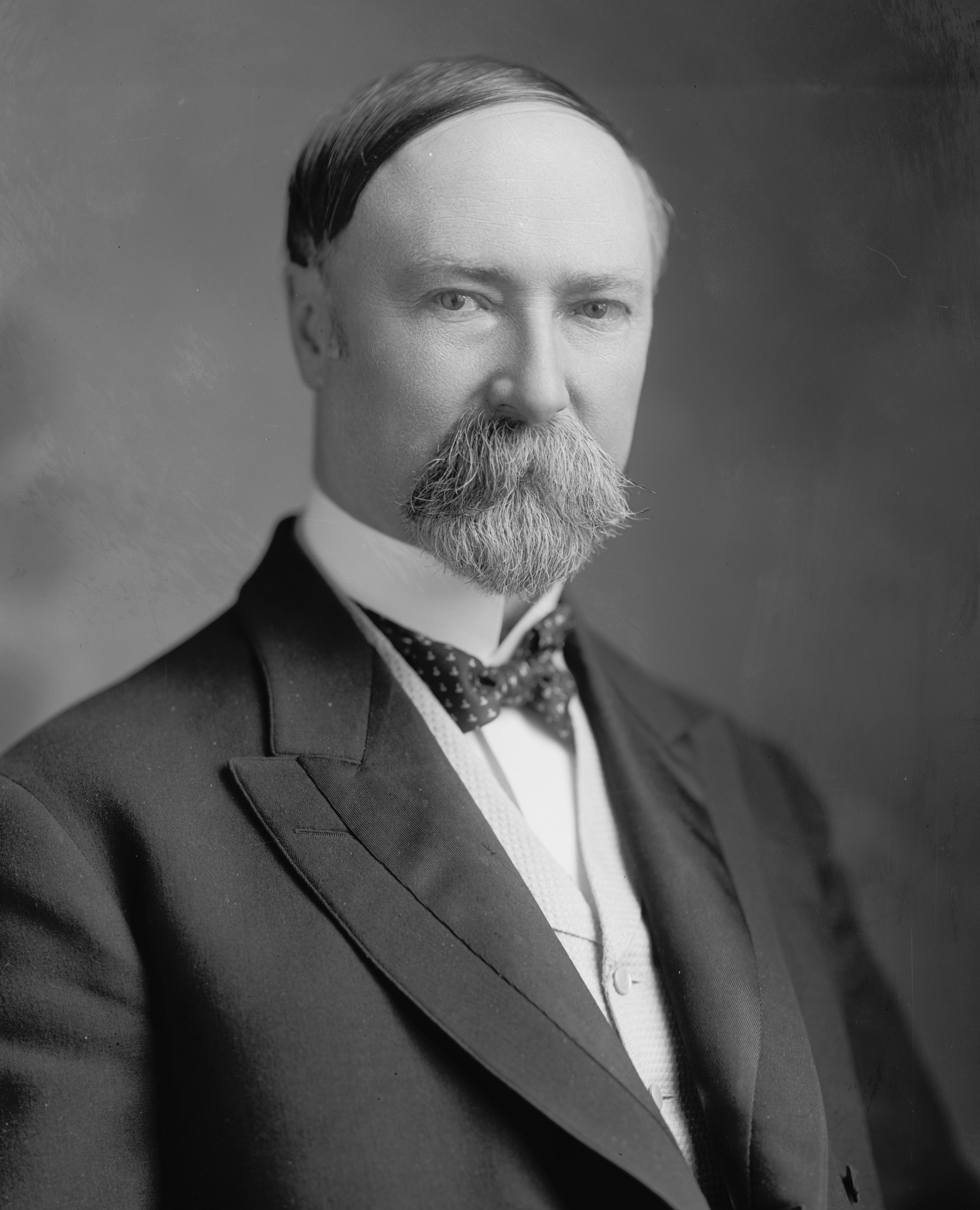
- Fairbanks, c. 1900s

26th Vice President of the United States
- In office March 4, 1905 – March 4, 1909
- President: Theodore Roosevelt
- Preceded by: Theodore Roosevelt
- Succeeded by: James S. Sherman

United States Senator from Indiana
- In office March 4, 1897 – March 3, 1905
- Preceded by: Daniel W. Voorhees
- Succeeded by: James A. Hemenway

Personal details
- Born: Charles Warren Fairbanks; May 11, 1852 Unionville Center, Ohio, U.S.
- Died: June 4, 1918 (aged 66) Indianapolis, Indiana, U.S.
- Resting place: Crown Hill Cemetery and Arboretum, Section 24, Lot 3; 39.8175875°N 86.1711419°W
- Party: Republican
- Spouse: Cornelia Cole (m. 1874; died 1913)
- Children: 5
- Education: Ohio Wesleyan University (BA, MA)

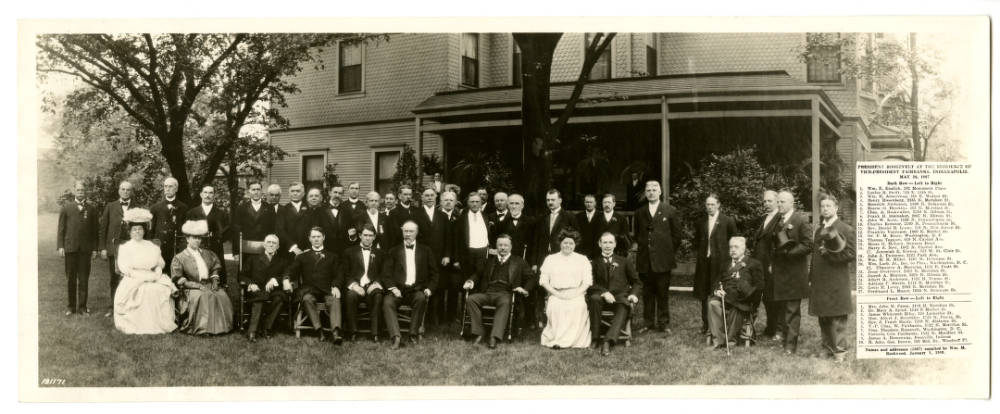
President Roosevelt and party at the Residence of Vice President Charles Warren Fairbanks. May 30, 1907

Charles Warren Fairbanks (May 11, 1852 – June 4, 1918) was the 26th vice president of the United States under President Theodore Roosevelt serving from 1905 to 1909. A member of the Republican Party, Fairbanks was previously a senator from Indiana from 1897 to 1905.

Born in Unionville Center, Ohio, Fairbanks moved to Indianapolis after graduating from Ohio Wesleyan University. He became an attorney and railroad financier, working under railroad magnate Jay Gould. Fairbanks delivered the keynote address at the 1896 Republican National Convention and won election to the Senate the following year. In the Senate, he became an advisor to President William McKinley and served on a commission that helped settle the Alaska boundary dispute.

The 1904 Republican National Convention selected Fairbanks as the running mate for President Theodore Roosevelt. As vice president, Fairbanks worked against Roosevelt's progressive policies. Fairbanks unsuccessfully sought the Republican nomination at the 1908 Republican National Convention and backed William Howard Taft in 1912 against Roosevelt.

Fairbanks sought the presidential nomination at the 1916 Republican National Convention, but was instead selected as the vice presidential nominee, with former Associate Justice and Governor Charles Evans Hughes, and would have been the third vice president to serve under different presidents (after George Clinton and John C. Calhoun), and the only one non-consecutively. The Hughes-Fairbanks ticket, however, narrowly lost to the Democratic ticket of President Woodrow Wilson and Vice President Thomas R. Marshall.

== Early life ==
Fairbanks was born in a log cabin near Unionville Center, Ohio, the son of Mary Adelaide (Smith) and Loriston Monroe Fairbanks, a wagon-maker. Fairbanks in his youth saw his family's home used as a hiding place for runaway slaves. After attending country schools and working on a farm, Fairbanks attended Ohio Wesleyan University, where he graduated in 1872. While there, Fairbanks was co-editor of the school newspaper with Cornelia Cole, whom he married after both graduated from the school.

== Early career ==
Fairbanks's first position was as an agent of the Associated Press in Pittsburgh, Pennsylvania, reporting on political rallies for Horace Greeley during the 1872 presidential election. He studied law in Pittsburgh before moving to Cleveland, Ohio, where he continued to work for the Associated Press while attending a semester at Cleveland Law School to complete his legal education. Fairbanks was admitted to the Ohio bar in 1874, and moved to Indianapolis, Indiana. In 1875 he received his Master of Arts degree from Ohio Wesleyan.

During his early years in Indiana, Fairbanks was paid $5,000 a year as manager for the bankrupt Indianapolis, Bloomington, and Western Railroad. With the assistance of his uncle, Charles W. Smith, whose connections had helped him obtain the position, Fairbanks was able to become a railroad financier and served as counsel for millionaire Jay Gould.

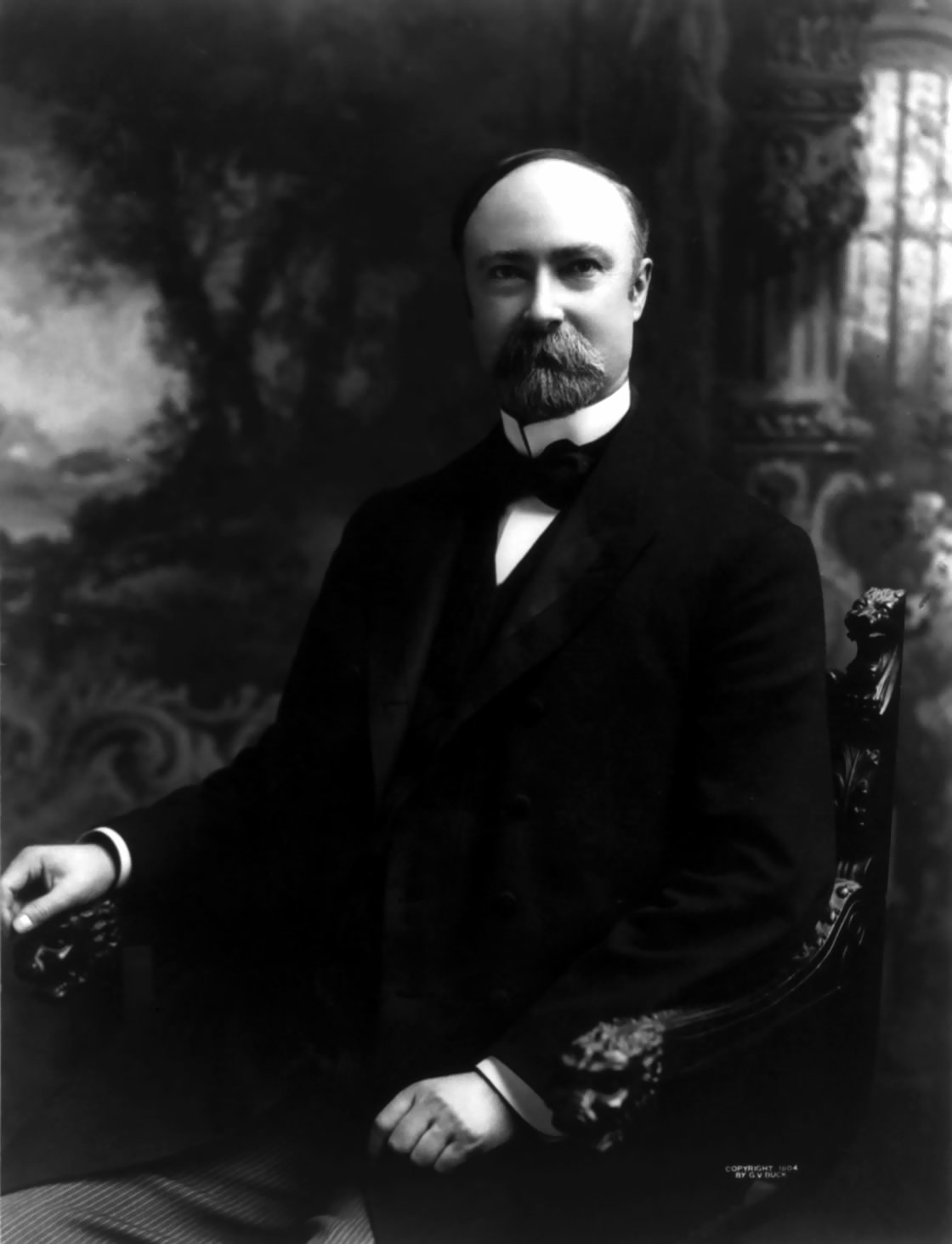
Fairbanks in his office

Prior to the 1888 Republican National Convention, federal judge Walter Q. Gresham sought Fairbanks's help in campaigning for the Republican nomination for U.S. President. When Benjamin Harrison won the nomination, Fairbanks supported him and made campaign speeches on his behalf. Afterward, Fairbanks began to take an even greater interest in politics, and made campaign speeches on Harrison's behalf again in the campaign of 1892. In 1893, Fairbanks was a candidate for the United States Senate, but Democrats controlled the state legislature and reelected incumbent Democrat David Turpie.

In 1894, Fairbanks was the most visible organizer and speaker on behalf of Republicans in elections for the state legislature. He was credited with delivering Republican majorities to both the Indiana House of Representatives and Indiana Senate, ensuring that a Republican would be elected to succeed Daniel W. Voorhees in the United States Senate at the end of Voorhees's term in 1897. At the 1896 Republican National Convention, Fairbanks was both temporary chairman and keynote speaker, further raising his public profile. Fairbanks was the most likely Republican candidate for Voorhees's seat, and in January 1897 Republican legislators formally chose him as their nominee. On January 19, 1897, Fairbanks was elected to the Senate, and he took his seat on March 4.

=== U.S. Senator ===
During his eight years in the U.S. Senate, Fairbanks served as a key advisor to McKinley during the Spanish–American War and was also the Chairman of the Committee on Immigration and the Committee on Public Buildings and Grounds. In 1898, Fairbanks was appointed a member of the United States and British Joint High Commission which met in Quebec City "for the adjustment of Canadian questions", including the Alaska boundary dispute.

== Vice presidency (1905–1909) ==
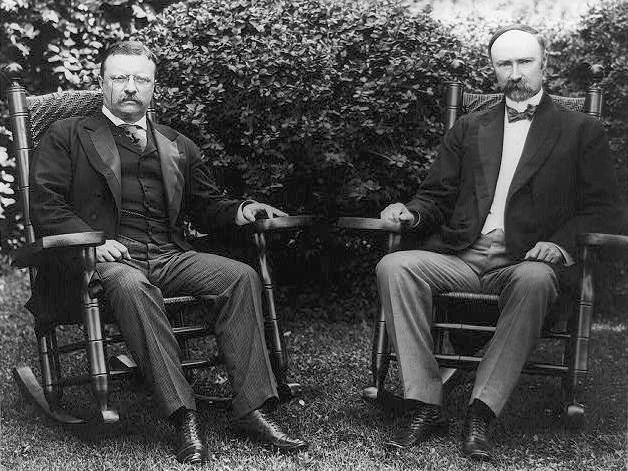
Fairbanks with Theodore Roosevelt in 1904

Fairbanks was elected vice president of the United States in 1904 on the Republican ticket with Theodore Roosevelt and served a four-year term, 1905 to 1909. He became the first vice president to serve a complete term without casting any tie-breaking votes as President of the Senate. Fairbanks, a conservative whom Roosevelt had once labeled a "reactionary machine politician" (and who had been caricatured as a "Wall Street Puppet" during the campaign), actively worked against Roosevelt's progressive "Square Deal" program. Roosevelt did not give Fairbanks a significant role in his administration, and (having chosen not to seek reelection) strongly promoted William Howard Taft as his potential successor in 1908. Fairbanks also sought the Republican nomination for president, but was unsuccessful and returned to the practice of law. In 1912, Fairbanks supported Taft's reelection against Roosevelt's Bull Moose candidacy.

=== Assassination attempt ===
Following the assassination of William McKinley, Fairbanks became an outspoken advocate for banning anarchists from entering the country, which motivated 32-year-old anarchist James McConnell to assassinate him.

In June 1905, Fairbanks travelled to Flint, Michigan to lay the cornerstone of a new federal building, and to then deliver a speech to over 2,000 attendees. Roughly 20 minutes into the speech, McConnell forced his way through the crowd holding a revolver concealed in his hip pocket. Four nearby detectives noticed this and choked McConnell until he was subdued. The crowd reacted angrily, with soldiers from the nearby army base in Fort Wayne who took part in the ceremony called for McConnell to be lynched. McConnell reportedly begged the detectives to protect him from angry attendees. After McConnell was placed in a police wagon to take him to the Saginaw Street Police Station, Fairbanks continued his speech without further interruption.

McConnell later told law enforcement that "his time would come soon," and that "he would yet be able to carry out his purpose and assassinate the vice president." As federal laws protecting vice presidents had not yet been enacted, he was only charged with disorderly conduct.

== Post-vice presidency (1909–1918) ==
=== Hughes's running mate ===
In 1916, Fairbanks was in charge of establishing the platform for the Republican party. He sought that year's Republican presidential nomination at the party's June convention. When Charles Evans Hughes was nominated, Fairbanks was selected by the convention as the vice presidential nominee, which would have returned him to office under a different president, a feat previously accomplished only by George Clinton and John C. Calhoun. In November, Hughes and Fairbanks lost a close election to the Democratic incumbents Woodrow Wilson and Thomas Marshall. Fairbanks and Adlai Stevenson (vice president from 1893 to 1897) share the distinction of seeking reelection to non-consecutive terms as vice president. Former vice president Stevenson ran for a second non-consecutive term with William Jennings Bryan in the 1900 election but he and Bryan lost to the Republican ticket of William McKinley and Theodore Roosevelt. After the election, Fairbanks resumed the practice of law in Indianapolis, but his health soon started to fail.

=== Death and legacy ===
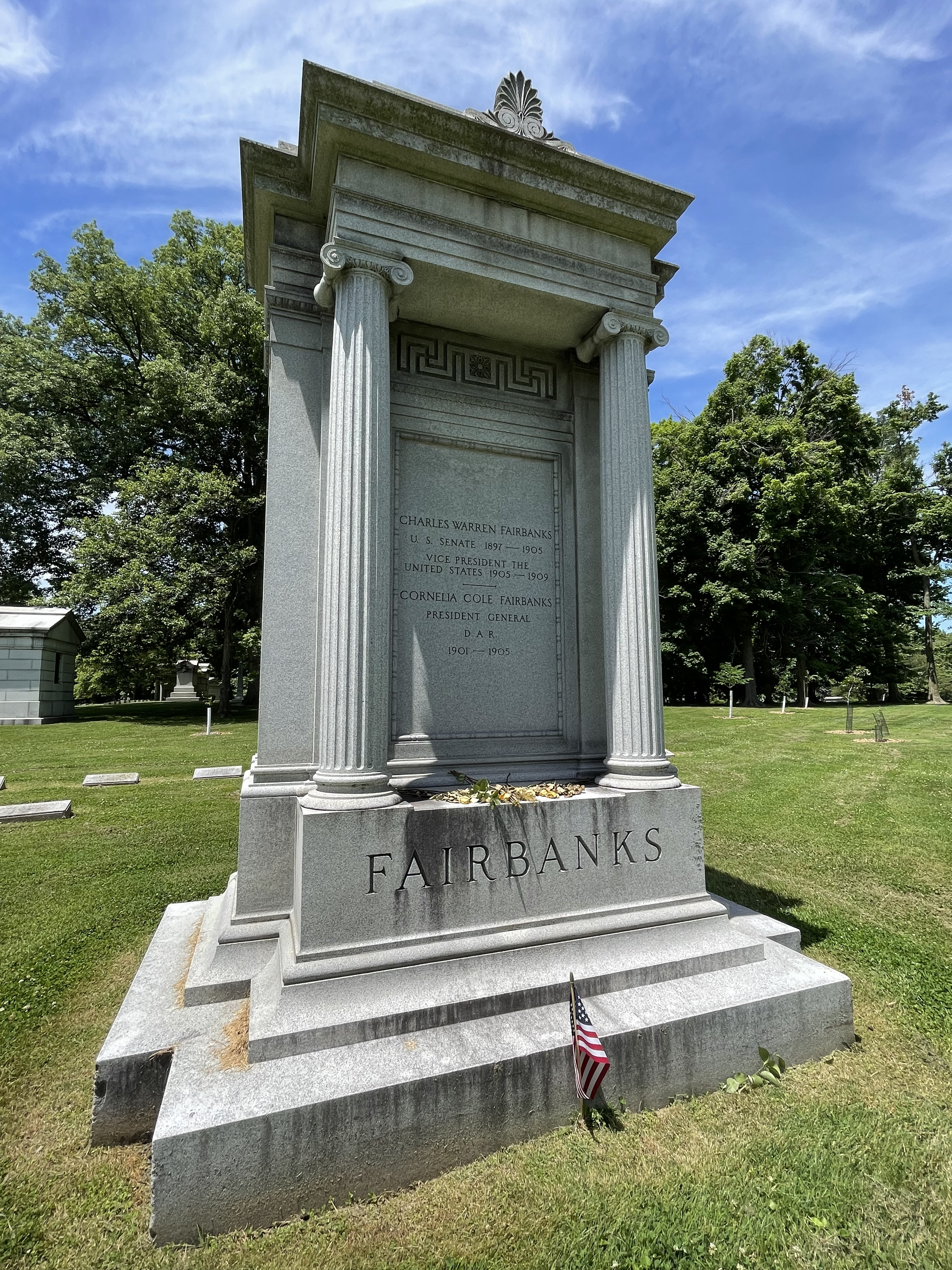
Grave of Charles Fairbanks at Crown Hill Cemetery in Indianapolis, Indiana, in 2022.

Fairbanks died of nephritis in his home on June 4, 1918, at the age of 66, and he was interred in Crown Hill Cemetery in Indianapolis.

Fairbanks received the honorary degree of LL.D. from Ohio Wesleyan University in 1901, and from Northwestern University in 1907. The Charles W. Fairbanks Professor of Politics and Government position at Ohio Wesleyan University is named for him.

The city of Fairbanks, Alaska, and the Fairbanks North Star Borough within which it lies; the Fairbanks School District in Union County, Ohio; Fairbanks, Minnesota; Fairbanks, Oregon; and Fairbanks Township, Michigan, are all named after him.

In 1966, the Indiana Sesquicentennial Commission placed an Indiana historical marker in front of Fairbanks's home at 30th and Meridian Streets in Indianapolis. On May 15, 2009, an Ohio historical marker was dedicated in Unionville Center, commemorating Fairbanks's birthplace.

== See also ==
- List of vice presidents of the United States by time in office

U.S. Senate
| Preceded by Daniel W. Voorhees | U.S. Senator (Class 3) from Indiana; 1897–1905; Served alongside: David Turpie, Albert J. Beveridge | Succeeded by James A. Hemenway |
Party political offices
| Preceded by Theodore Roosevelt | Republican nominee for Vice President of the United States; 1904 | Succeeded by James Sherman |
| Preceded by Nicholas M. Butler | Republican nominee for Vice President of the United States; 1916 | Succeeded by Calvin Coolidge |
Political offices
| Preceded by Theodore Roosevelt | Vice President of the United States; 1905–1909 | Succeeded by James S. Sherman |
