= Unionville Center, Ohio =

Village in Union County, Ohio, US

- Village
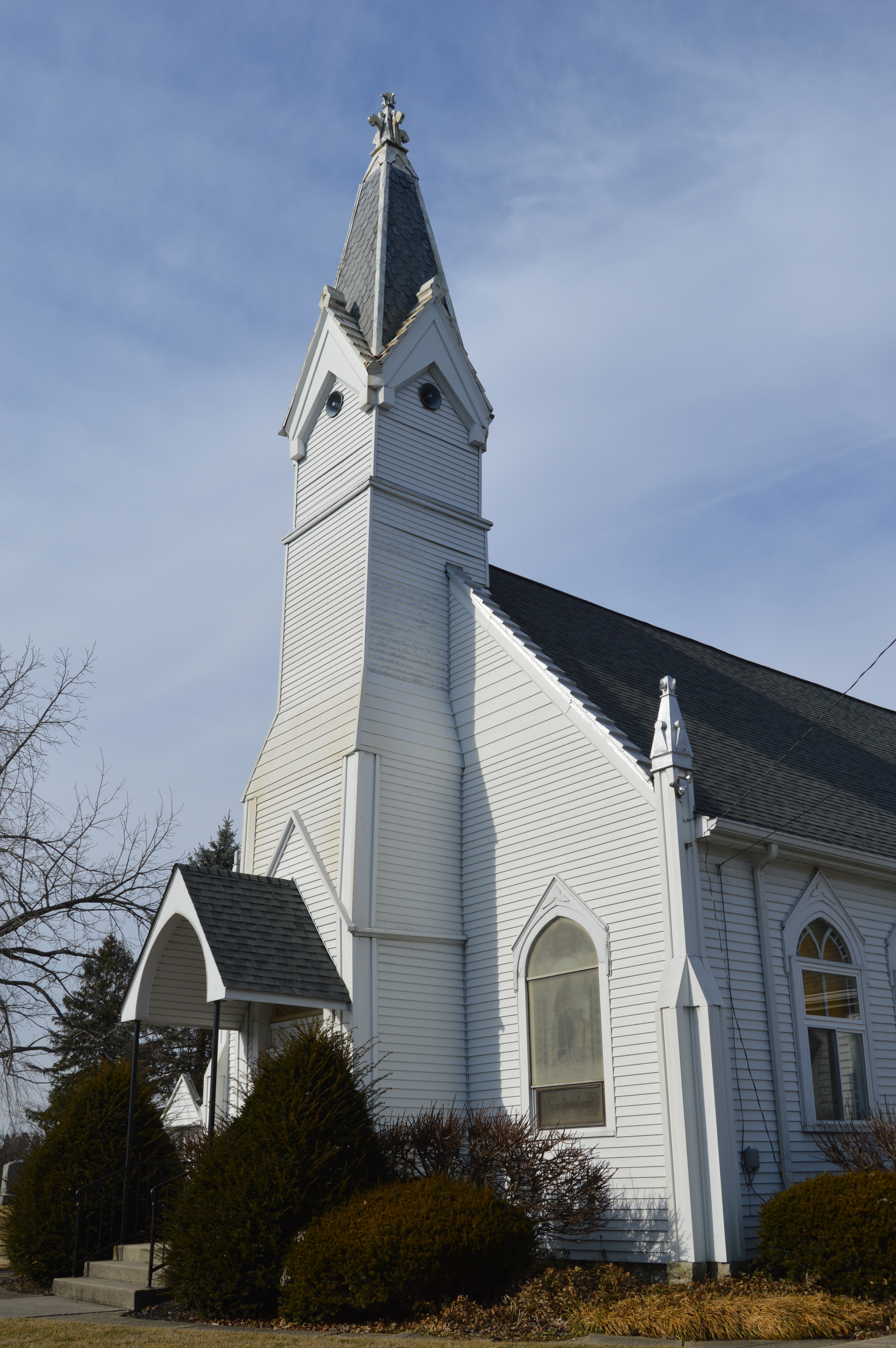
- Methodist church

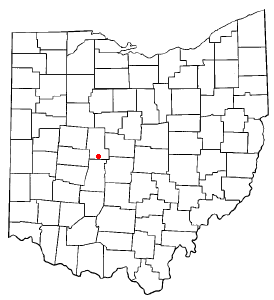
- Location of Unionville Center, Ohio

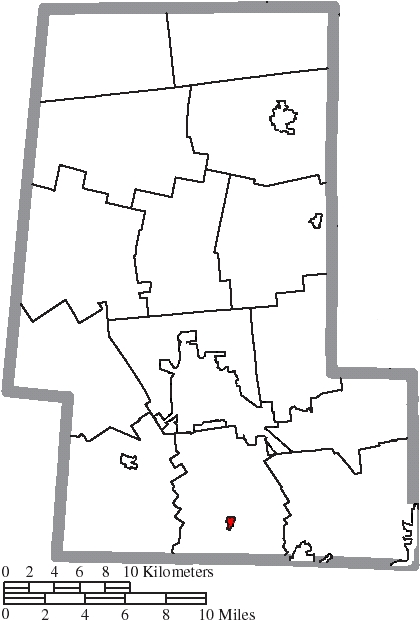
- Location of Unionville Center in Union County
- Coordinates: 40°08′12″N 83°20′30″W
- Country: United States
- State: Ohio
- County: Union
- Township: Darby

Area
  - Total: 0.16 sq mi (0.42 km^{2})
  - Land: 0.16 sq mi (0.41 km^{2})
  - Water: 0.0039 sq mi (0.01 km^{2})
- Elevation: 971 ft (296 m)

Population (2020)
  - Total: 241
  - Density: 1,521.0/sq mi (587.27/km^{2})
- Time zone: UTC-5 (Eastern (EST))
  - Summer (DST): UTC-4 (EDT)
- ZIP code: 43077
- Area code: 614
- FIPS code: 39-78834
- GNIS feature ID: 2400026

Unionville Center is a village in Union County, Ohio, United States. The population was 241 at the 2020 census. The village is home to the Charles W. Fairbanks Festival that is held each May.

== History ==
Unionville Center was originally called Unionville, and under that name, the village was laid out and platted in 1847. The Unionville Center post office has been in operation since 1848. The village was incorporated in 1879.

== Geography ==
According to the United States Census Bureau, the village has a total area of 0.17 square miles (0.44 km^{2}), of which 0.16 square miles (0.41 km^{2}) is land and 0.01 square miles (0.03 km^{2}) is water.

== Demographics ==
Historical population
Census	Pop.	Note	%±
1880	200		—
1890	231		15.5%
1900	259		12.1%
1910	239		−7.7%
1920	193		−19.2%
1930	189		−2.1%
1940	233		23.3%
1950	237		1.7%
1960	305		28.7%
1970	255		−16.4%
1980	272		6.7%
1990	238		−12.5%
2000	299		25.6%
2010	233		−22.1%
2020	241		3.4%
U.S. Decennial Census

The population of the village was 231 in 1890, 259 in 1900, and 239 in 1910.

=== 2010 census ===
As of the census of 2010, there were 233 people, 78 households, and 56 families living in the village. The population density was 1,456.3 inhabitants per square mile (562.3/km^{2}). There were 82 housing units at an average density of 512.5 per square mile (197.9/km^{2}). The racial makeup of the village was 96.1% White, 0.4% Native American, 2.6% Asian, and 0.9% from two or more races. Hispanic or Latino of any race were 0.9% of the population.

There were 78 households, of which 42.3% had children under the age of 18 living with them, 53.8% were married couples living together, 12.8% had a female householder with no husband present, 5.1% had a male householder with no wife present, and 28.2% were non-families. 19.2% of all households were made up of individuals, and 9% had someone living alone who was 65 years of age or older. The average household size was 2.99 and the average family size was 3.38.

The median age in the village was 39.8 years. 29.6% of residents were under the age of 18; 6.4% were between the ages of 18 and 24; 23.7% were from 25 to 44; 28.4% were from 45 to 64; and 12% were 65 years of age or older. The gender makeup of the village was 51.5% male and 48.5% female.

=== 2000 census ===
As of the census of 2000, there were 299 people, 110 households, and 85 families living in the village. The population density was 1,874.5 inhabitants per square mile (723.7/km^{2}). There were 121 housing units at an average density of 758.6 per square mile (292.9/km^{2}). The racial makeup of the village was 99.67% White, and 0.33% from two or more races. Hispanic or Latino of any race were 1.34% of the population.

There were 110 households, out of which 33.6% had children under the age of 18 living with them, 66.4% were married couples living together, 3.6% had a female householder with no husband present, and 22.7% were non-families. 21.8% of all households were made up of individuals, and 9.1% had someone living alone who was 65 years of age or older. The average household size was 2.72 and the average family size was 3.18.

In the village, the population was spread out, with 26.8% under the age of 18, 4.7% from 18 to 24, 30.4% from 25 to 44, 22.7% from 45 to 64, and 15.4% who were 65 years of age or older. The median age was 39 years. For every 100 females there were 103.4 males. For every 100 females age 18 and over, there were 99.1 males.

The median income for a household in the village was $45,682, and the median income for a family was $52,750. Males had a median income of $32,500 versus $23,750 for females. The per capita income for the village was $16,591. About 2.7% of families and 6.3% of the population were below the poverty line, including 9.5% of those under the age of eighteen and none of those 65 or over.

== Education ==
The school district is Fairbanks Local School District.

== Notable people ==
Charles W. Fairbanks, twenty-sixth Vice President of the United States.
