= List of vice presidents of the United States by time in office =

The length of a full four-year term of office for a vice president of the United States usually amounts to 1,461 days (three common years of 365 days plus one leap year of 366 days). The listed number of days is calculated as the difference between dates, which counts the number of calendar days except the first day (day zero). If the first day were included, all numbers would be one day more.

Shortest vice presidency
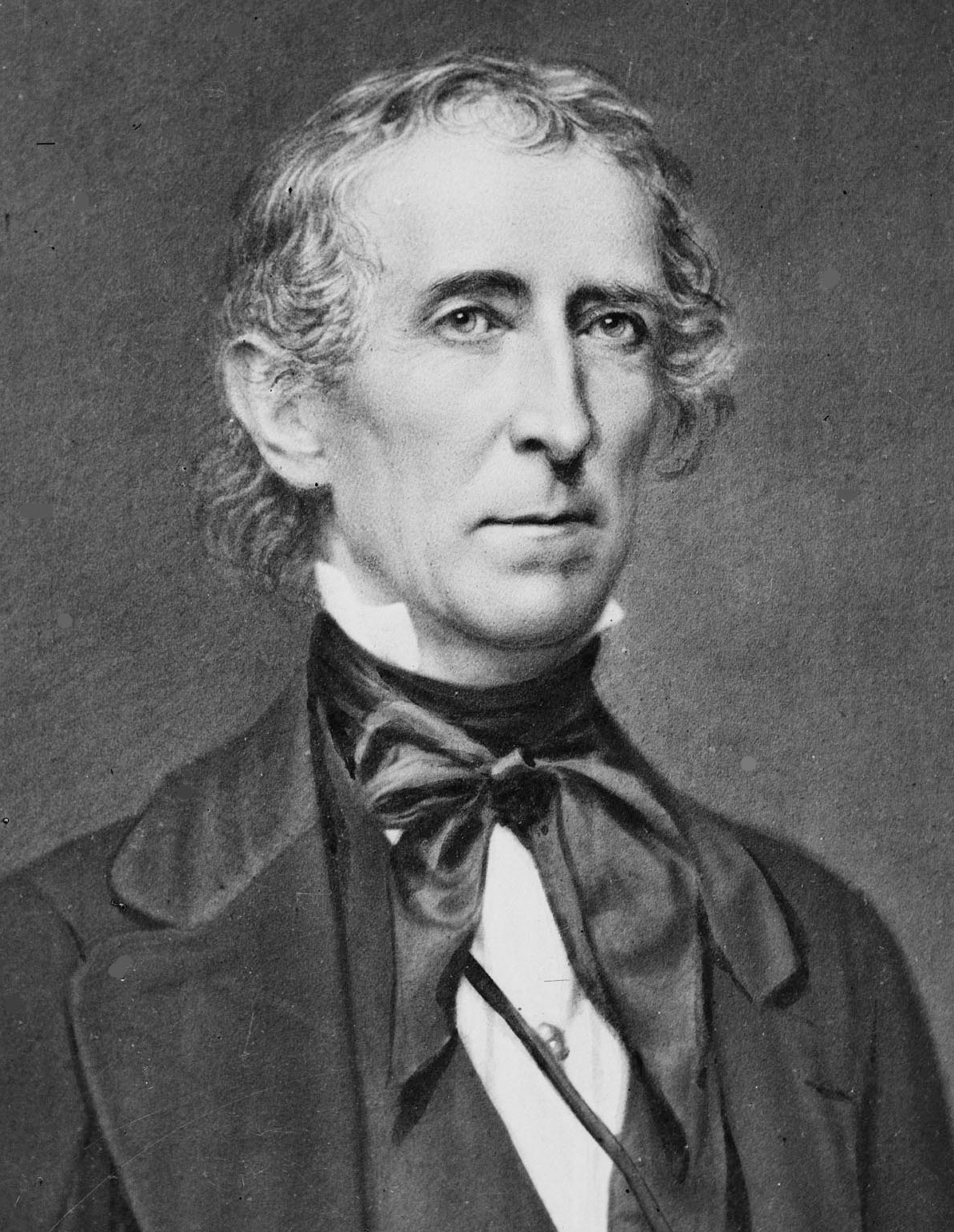
John Tyler
31 days
(1841)

Since 1789, there have been 50 people sworn into office as Vice President of the United States. Of these, nine succeeded to the presidency during their term, seven died while in office, and two resigned. Since the adoption of the Twenty-fifth Amendment to the United States Constitution (February 10, 1967), when there is a vacancy in the office of the vice president, the president nominates a successor who takes office upon confirmation by a majority vote of both Houses of Congress.

== Vice presidents by time in office ==
| Rank | Vice President | Length in days | Order of vice presidency | President served under | Number of terms |
|---|---|---|---|---|---|
| 1 tie | Daniel D. Tompkins | 2,922 | 6th • March 4, 1817 – March 4, 1825 | James Monroe | Two full terms |
| 1 tie | Thomas R. Marshall | 2,922 | 28th • March 4, 1913 – March 4, 1921 | Woodrow Wilson | Two full terms |
| 1 tie | Richard Nixon | 2,922 | 36th • January 20, 1953 – January 20, 1961 | Dwight D. Eisenhower | Two full terms |
| 1 tie | George H. W. Bush | 2,922 | 43rd • January 20, 1981 – January 20, 1989 | Ronald Reagan | Two full terms |
| 1 tie | Al Gore | 2,922 | 45th • January 20, 1993 – January 20, 2001 | Bill Clinton | Two full terms |
| 1 tie | Dick Cheney | 2,922 | 46th • January 20, 2001 – January 20, 2009 | George W. Bush | Two full terms |
| 1 tie | Joe Biden | 2,922 | 47th • January 20, 2009 – January 20, 2017 | Barack Obama | Two full terms |
| 8 | John Nance Garner | 2,879 (Note: The 20th Amendment (ratified January 23, 1933) moved Inauguration Day from March 4 to January 20. The 1937 presidential inauguration was the first to take place on the new date. As a result, John Nance Garner's first term in office (1933–1937) was only 1,418 days long, 1 month and 12 days shorter than a normal term.) | 32nd • March 4, 1933 – January 20, 1941 | Franklin D. Roosevelt | Two full terms |
| 9 | John Adams | 2,874 (Note: Due to logistical issues, John Adams assumed the vice presidency 1 month and 17 days after the March 4, 1789 scheduled start of operations of the new government under the Constitution. As a result, his first term (1789–1793) was only 1,413 days long, the shortest term for a U.S. vice president who neither died in office, resigned, nor succeeded to the presidency mid-term.) | 1st • April 21, 1789 – March 4, 1797 | George Washington | Two full terms |
| 10 | John C. Calhoun | 2,856 | 7th • March 4, 1825 – December 28, 1832 (Note: Resigned from office) | John Quincy Adams and Andrew Jackson | One full term; resigned 3 years, 9 months and 24 days into second term |
| 11 | George Clinton | 2,604 | 4th • March 4, 1805 – April 20, 1812 (Note: Died in office) | Thomas Jefferson and James Madison | One full term; died 3 years, 1 month and 16 days into second term |
| 12 | Spiro Agnew | 1,724 | 39th • January 20, 1969 – October 10, 1973 | Richard Nixon | One full term; resigned 8 months and 20 days into second term |
| 13 tie | Aaron Burr | 1,461 | 3rd • March 4, 1801 – March 4, 1805 | Thomas Jefferson | One full term |
| 13 tie | Martin Van Buren | 1,461 | 8th • March 4, 1833 – March 4, 1837 | Andrew Jackson | One full term |
| 13 tie | Richard Johnson | 1,461 | 9th • March 4, 1837 – March 4, 1841 | Martin Van Buren | One full term |
| 13 tie | George M. Dallas | 1,461 | 11th • March 4, 1845 – March 4, 1849 | James K. Polk | One full term |
| 13 tie | John C. Breckinridge | 1,461 | 14th • March 4, 1857 – March 4, 1861 | James Buchanan | One full term |
| 13 tie | Hannibal Hamlin | 1,461 | 15th • March 4, 1861 – March 4, 1865 | Abraham Lincoln | One full term |
| 13 tie | Schuyler Colfax | 1,461 | 17th • March 4, 1869 – March 4, 1873 | Ulysses S. Grant | One full term |
| 13 tie | William A. Wheeler | 1,461 | 19th • March 4, 1877 – March 4, 1881 | Rutherford B. Hayes | One full term |
| 13 tie | Levi P. Morton | 1,461 | 22nd • March 4, 1889 – March 4, 1893 | Benjamin Harrison | One full term |
| 13 tie | Adlai E. Stevenson | 1,461 | 23rd • March 4, 1893 – March 4, 1897 | Grover Cleveland | One full term |
| 13 tie | Charles W. Fairbanks | 1,461 | 26th • March 4, 1905 – March 4, 1909 | Theodore Roosevelt | One full term |
| 13 tie | Charles G. Dawes | 1,461 | 30th • March 4, 1925 – March 4, 1929 | Calvin Coolidge | One full term |
| 13 tie | Charles Curtis | 1,461 | 31st • March 4, 1929 – March 4, 1933 | Herbert Hoover | One full term |
| 13 tie | Henry A. Wallace | 1,461 | 33rd • January 20, 1941 – January 20, 1945 | Franklin D. Roosevelt | One full term |
| 13 tie | Alben W. Barkley | 1,461 | 35th • January 20, 1949 – January 20, 1953 | Harry S. Truman | One full term |
| 13 tie | Hubert Humphrey | 1,461 | 38th • January 20, 1965 – January 20, 1969 | Lyndon B. Johnson | One full term |
| 13 tie | Walter Mondale | 1,461 | 42nd • January 20, 1977 – January 20, 1981 | Jimmy Carter | One full term |
| 13 tie | Dan Quayle | 1,461 | 44th • January 20, 1989 – January 20, 1993 | George H. W. Bush | One full term |
| 13 tie | Mike Pence | 1,461 | 48th • January 20, 2017 – January 20, 2021 | Donald Trump | One full term |
| 13 tie | Kamala Harris | 1,461 | 49th • January 20, 2021 – January 20, 2025 | Joe Biden | One full term |
| 33 | Thomas Jefferson | 1,460 (Note: Of years evenly divisible by 100, only those also evenly divisible by 400 are leap years. The years 1800 and 1900 are divisible by 100, but not by 400; therefore, the 1797–1801 term of Thomas Jefferson did not include a 366-day leap year and was one day shorter than a normal full term. The same was true for the 1897–1901 term to which Garret Hobart was elected, but he died before completing it.) | 2nd • March 4, 1797 – March 4, 1801 | John Adams | One full term |
| 34 | James S. Sherman | 1,336 | 27th • March 4, 1909 – October 30, 1912 | William Howard Taft | Died 3 years, 7 months and 26 days into term |
| 35 | Lyndon B. Johnson | 1,036 | 37th • January 20, 1961 – November 22, 1963 (Note: Succeeded to presidency) | John F. Kennedy | Succeeded to presidency 2 years, 10 months and 2 days into term |
| 36 | Henry Wilson | 993 | 18th • March 4, 1873 – November 22, 1875 | Ulysses S. Grant | Died 2 years, 8 months and 18 days into term |
| 37 | Garret Hobart | 992 | 24th • March 4, 1897 – November 21, 1899 | William McKinley | Died 2 years, 8 months and 17 days into term |
| 38 | Calvin Coolidge | 881 | 29th • March 4, 1921 – August 2, 1923 | Warren G. Harding | Succeeded to presidency 2 years, 4 months and 29 days into term |
| 39 | Nelson Rockefeller | 763 | 41st • December 19, 1974 (Note: Confirmed by U.S. Congress.) – January 20, 1977 | Gerald Ford | One partial term (2 years, 1 month and 1 day) |
| 40 | JD Vance | 652 (Note: As of November 3, 2026) | 50th • January 20, 2025 – Incumbent | Donald Trump | Currently serving |
| 41 | Elbridge Gerry | 629 | 5th • March 4, 1813 – November 23, 1814 | James Madison | Died 1 year, 8 months and 19 days into term |
| 42 | Millard Fillmore | 492 | 12th • March 4, 1849 – July 9, 1850 | Zachary Taylor | Succeeded to presidency 1 year, 4 months and 5 days into term |
| 43 | Thomas A. Hendricks | 266 | 21st • March 4 – November 25, 1885 | Grover Cleveland | Died 8 months and 21 days into term |
| 44 | Gerald Ford | 246 | 40th • December 6, 1973 – August 9, 1974 | Richard Nixon | Succeeded to presidency 8 months and 3 days into partial term |
| 45 | Chester A. Arthur | 199 | 20th • March 4 – September 19, 1881 | James A. Garfield | Succeeded to presidency 6 months and 15 days into term |
| 46 | Theodore Roosevelt | 194 | 25th • March 4 – September 14, 1901 | William McKinley | Succeeded to presidency 6 months and 10 days into term |
| 47 | Harry S. Truman | 82 | 34th • January 20 – April 12, 1945 | Franklin D. Roosevelt | Succeeded to presidency 2 months and 23 days into term |
| 48 | William R. King | 45 | 13th • March 4 – April 18, 1853 | Franklin Pierce | Died 1 month and 14 days into term |
| 49 | Andrew Johnson | 42 | 16th • March 4 – April 15, 1865 | Abraham Lincoln | Succeeded to presidency 1 month and 11 days into term |
| 50 | John Tyler | 31 | 10th • March 4 – April 4, 1841 | William Henry Harrison | Succeeded to presidency 31 days into term |

== See also ==
- Acting President of the United States
- List of presidents of the United States by time in office
- United States presidential line of succession
