= Joe Kindregan =

Irish structural engineer

Joe Kindregan FIStructE
- Born: 1954 (age 71–72); Kildare, Ireland
- Education: University College Dublin, Trinity College, Dublin, Dublin Institute of Technology
- Engineering career
- Discipline: Structural engineer
- Institutions: Institution of Structural Engineers; Institution of Civil Engineers
- Practice name: Joseph A Kindregan and Associates, County Kildare, Ireland

Joe Kindregan is an Irish structural engineer born in 1954 in Ireland

== Early life and education ==
Kindregan read civil engineering at University College, Dublin. In 1978 he took a PGDip in Computing followed by a PGDip in Project Management at Trinity College, Dublin. In 1985 he took a PGDip in Legal Studies at Dublin Institute of Technology

== Career ==
From 1976-80 Kindregan worked in the Dublin office of Arup. In 1980 he moved to Abalkhail Consulting Engineers until 1984 working in Dublin, Riyadh and Los Angeles. He returned to Dublin as a lecturer at the Dublin Institute of Technology becoming Head of the Department of Civil and Structural Engineering in 1992- a post he held until 2014. Since then Kindregan has been an independent consultant based in County Kildare, Ireland. Kindregan is President of the Institution of Structural Engineers in 2019.

== Awards and honours ==
- Winner of Pierce Malone Scholarship [3] [2]. at National University of Ireland, 1976,
- Association of Consulting Engineers of Ireland President's Award 2019
