= John Hill (British engineer) =

British structural engineer

John Hill FREng FIStructE FICE FIEI
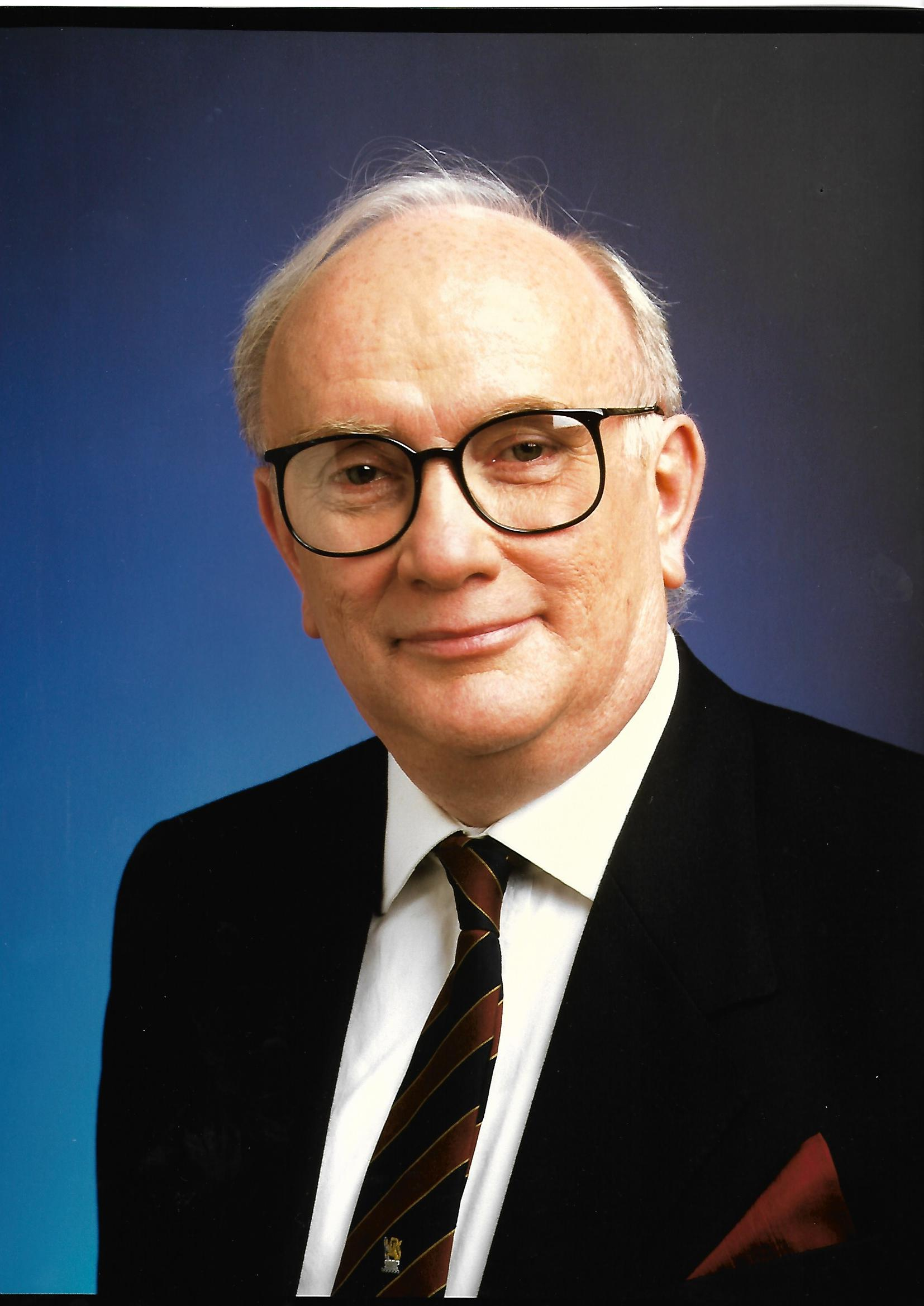
- Born: 1938 (age 87–88); Wembley, Middlesex, England
- Education: Belfast Royal Academy, Queen's University Belfast
- Engineering career
- Discipline: Structural engineer
- Institutions: Institution of Structural Engineers; Institution of Civil Engineers; Institution of Engineers of Ireland
- Practice name: Doran Consulting

John Allan Hill is a British structural engineer born in 1938.

== Early life and education ==
Hill was born in Wembley, London but the family moved to Belfast where his father W A Hill was a railway civil engineer. He was educated at Belfast Royal Academy before reading Civil Engineering at Queen's University Belfast.

== Career ==
After graduating in 1960 Hill returned to London to work for A.J. & J.D. Harris (later Harris & Sutherland and Jacobs Engineering since 2004). He worked on the structural design of schools and offices and the Commonwealth Institute building in South Kensington using prestressed concrete. He married June in 1961 and the couple moved to Derry where Hill worked for the civil engineering contracting company Farrans Construction on the building of the Coolkeeragh power station. He returned to consulting engineering in Belfast first working with Robert Gillen and then Dr I G Doran & Partners (Doran Consulting since 2005). Hill‘s projects included Craigavon Area Hospital and Antrim Area Hospital, Craigavon Shopping Centre with a cable stayed roof, long span construction at Valley Leisure Centre, the De Lorean motor car factory at Dunmurry, office buildings including Castle Buildings at Stormont. He has designed highway bridges, cable stayed and suspension footbridges. Design work for Iraq included extensive foundations and a major pipe-sinking below the Tigris, both in Baghdad. He led the design of plant supporting steelwork for Sizewell B Nuclear Power Station, Suffolk, and Guangdong in China.

From 1992 until his retirement in 2002 Hill was senior partner of Dr I G Doran & Partners. Hill was the Royal Academy of Engineering Visiting Professor at both Queen's University and the University of Ulster. He was a member of the Northern Ireland Building Regulations Advisory Committee. Hill was President of the Institution of Structural Engineers in 2000-01 and chairman of the Joint Board of Moderators - the accrediting body for degree courses for the construction industry 2005-07.

== Awards and honours ==
- Honorary Degree Queen’s University Belfast
