= List of presidents of the Republic of the Rio Grande =

President of the Republic of the Rio Grande
- Formation: January 17, 1840
- Abolished: November 6, 1840

This is a list of the presidents of the Republic of the Rio Grande that insurgents against the Central Mexican Government sought to establish in northern Mexico. The rebellion lasted from January 17 to November 6, 1840 and the Republic of the Rio Grande was never officially recognized.

On January 17, 1840 a meeting was held at the Oreveña Ranch near Laredo. A group of notables from the states of Coahuila, Nuevo León, and Tamaulipas advocated a rebellion seeking secession from Mexico and formation of their own federal republic with Laredo as the capital. However, those states' own congresses and governments never took any action to support the insurgents, and requested the help of the Central government in Mexico City to aid the local state armies.

The insurgents designated their own officials. They were:

- Jesús de Cárdenas as President.
- Antonio Canales Rosillo as commander-in-chief of the army.
- Juan Nepomuceno Molano as council representative for Tamaulipas.
- Francisco Vidaurri y Villaseñor as council representative for Coahuila.
- Manuel María de Llano as council representative for Nuevo León.
- Juan Francisco de Farías as Secretary of State.
- José María Jesús Carbajal as council to the Secretary of State.

== Officeholders ==
In office	President
January 17, 1840 – November 6, 1840	Jesús de Cárdenas
