= Tim Ibell =

South African structural engineer (born 1967)

- Born: 1967 (age 58–59); Cape Town
- Education: University of Cape Town, University of Cambridge
- Children: 1
- Engineering career
- Discipline: Structural engineer
- Institutions: Institution of Structural Engineers; Institution of Civil Engineers
- Practice name: University of Bath

Tim Ibell (born 1967 in Cape Town) is a South African structural engineer.

== Early life and education ==
Ibell grew up in Constantia, Cape Town, South Africa attended Western Province Prep school and the Diocesan College. He read Civil engineering at the University of Cape Town and graduated in 1988. He moved to the UK and took a PhD from the University of Cambridge in 1992.

== Career ==
After his PhD, Ibell returned to South Africa to work for Sasol as a Resident engineer at a building chemical plant. Ibell soon returned to the University of Cambridge as a post-doctoral researcher. In 1997, he moved to a Lectureship at the University of Bath. In 2002, he gained a Fulbright Distinguished Scholar Award to work at the Department of Civil Engineering at the Missouri University of Science and Technology, Rolla, Missouri, USA. Ibell was promoted to professor of civil engineering at the University of Bath in 2003, was head of department from 2005 to 2008, and again from 2010 to 2013. He was associate dean (graduate studies) from 2008 to 2013 followed by Associate Dean (Research) from 2013 to 2017.

He moved to the University of Cambridge as the Sir Kirby Laing Professor of Civil Engineering in 2017 and returned to the University of Bath in 2018. Ibell was President of the Institution of Structural Engineers in 2015. He was elected a Fellow of the Royal Academy of Engineering, and Fellow of the Institution of Civil Engineers. Ibell is an advisor to the Arup Foundation, a BRE Fellow, a Member of the 2021 UK Research Excellence Framework sub-panel for Engineering, and a Member of the UK Civil Engineering Degree Accreditation body, the Joint Board of Moderators

== Awards and honours ==
- Fulbright Scholar 2002
- Mary Tasker Award for teaching excellence 2008
- Husband Prize 2007

== Selected publications ==
- Tim Ibell publications
