= Arnold Waters =

Sir Arnold Waters
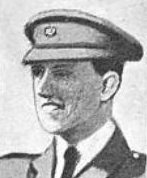
- Born: 23 September 1886; Plymouth, Devon, England
- Died: 22 January 1981 (aged 94); Sutton Coldfield, West Midlands, England
- Military career
- Allegiance: United Kingdom
- Branch: British Army
- Rank: Major
- Units: Royal Engineers
- Conflicts: First World War
- Awards: Victoria Cross; Knight Bachelor; Commander of the Order of the British Empire; Distinguished Service Order; Military Cross; Mentioned in Despatches
- Other work: President of the Institution of Structural Engineers

Sir Arnold Horace Santo Waters, VC, CBE, DSO, MC (23 September 1886 – 22 January 1981) was a British engineer, soldier and an English recipient of the Victoria Cross, the highest award for gallantry in the face of the enemy that can be awarded to British and Commonwealth forces.

== Details ==
He was 32 years old, and an acting major in the 218th Field Company, Corps of Royal Engineers, British Army during the First World War at the second battle of the Sambre when the following deed took place for which he was awarded the VC:

On 4 November 1918 near Ors, France, Major Waters, with his Field Company, was bridging the Oise-Sambre Canal under artillery and machine-gun fire at close range, the bridge being damaged and the building party suffering severe casualties. All Major Waters' officers had been killed or wounded and he at once went forward and personally supervised the completion of the bridge, working on cork floats while under such intense fire that it seemed impossible that he could survive. The success of the operation was entirely due to his valour and example.

== Further information ==
Later he was knighted, becoming Sir Arnold Waters. He was the President of the Institution of Structural Engineers in 1933–34 and 1943–1944, the only person to hold the post twice.

== The medal ==
His Victoria Cross is displayed at the Royal Engineers Museum, Chatham, Kent.
