= Robert McKittrick =

British structural engineer

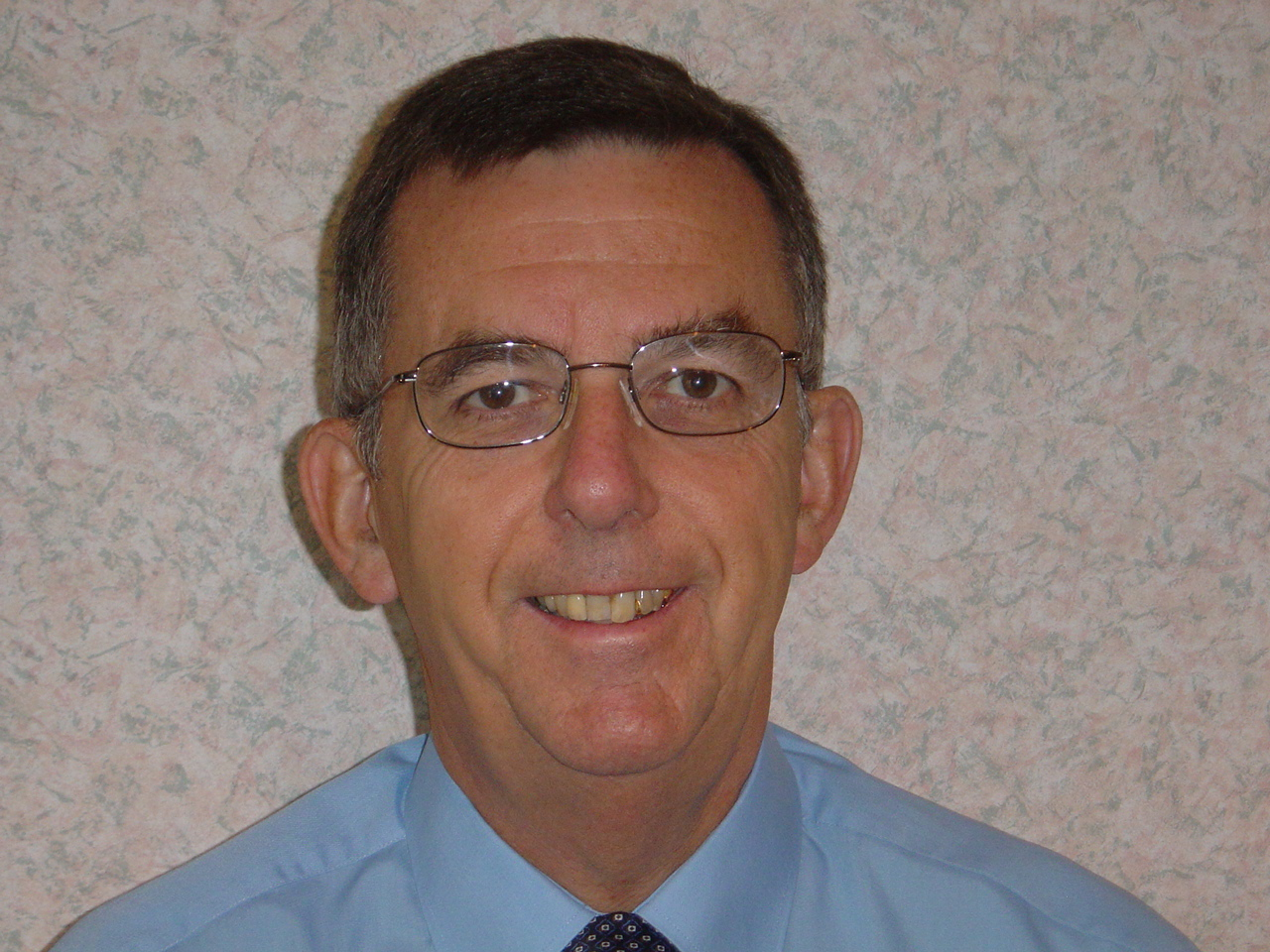
- Born: 1944 (age 81–82); Glasgow, Scotland
- Education: Royal College of Science and Technology now University of Strathclyde, Glasgow University.
- Engineering career
- Discipline: Structural engineer
- Institutions: Institution of Structural Engineers; Institution of Civil Engineers
- Practice name: Scott, Wilson Kirkpatrick & Partners (now AECOM)

Robert McKittrick is a British structural engineer born in 1944 in Glasgow, Scotland.

== Early life and education ==
McKittrick attended the Royal College of Science and Technology now University of Strathclyde but graduated from Glasgow University with a degree in civil engineering in 1967.

== Career ==
After graduation McKittrick joined Scott, Wilson Kirkpatrick & Partners (now AECOM) designing and detailing some major concrete bridge foundations, retaining walls and a footbridge on the Woodside Section of the Glasgow Inner Ring Road (GIRR). In 1969 he moved to work on site supervising the construction of the same section of GIRR. He qualified as a Chartered Civil Engineer and moved to Balfour Beatty working on site at a sewage works but soon returned to Scott Wilson supervising the construction of the Renfrew Motorway section of the Glasgow Inner Ring Road. He also worked in Pakistan and Saudi Arabia. In 1978 he transferred with his wife Margaret to Hong Kong and worked there for 7 years on a number of projects on design and supervision of infrastructure for Tuen Mun New Town including land reclamation, roads, drains, bridges, a ferry pier, sewage pumping stations and a light rail system. In 1985 he returned to the UK to work in Scott Wilson's Chesterfield Office and was appointed a Partner in 1987. In 1999 he transferred to Basingstoke where he was Director for all European Operations of Scott Wilson and a member of their International Board.

McKittrick was a Royal Academy of Engineering Visiting Professor at the University of Sheffield. He was President of the Institution of Structural Engineers in 2002-03.

McKittrick as a non-executive Director of Chesterfield Royal Hospital NHS Trust. He was a Trustee and Treasurer of an ecumenical charity that builds emergy accommodation for homeless young people. McKittrick is one of the founders of the anti-corruption Forum

== Selected projects ==
- Woodside Section, Glasgow Inner Ring Road, UK
- Water Supply, Nigeria and Kenya
- Tuen Mun New Town, Hong Kong
- Light Rail System, Nottingham, UK
- A19 DBFO, NE England, UK
