= List of presidents of South Korea by age =

This is a list of presidents of South Korea by age.

== Overview ==
Under the 1988 Constitution of the Sixth Republic of Korea, the president must be at least 40 years old at the time of taking office. The median age of presidents upon assuming office is 61 years. The youngest person to become president was Park Chung Hee, who assumed office in 1962 at the age of 44, after he seized power in the May 16 coup of 1961. The youngest president to assume office by election is Roh Tae-woo, who was elected in 1987 at the age of 55. The oldest person to assume the presidency was Kim Dae-jung, he assumed office in 1998 at the age of 74.

The youngest president at the end of his tenure is Chun Doo-hwan, he left office in 1988 at the age of 57. The president with the shortest lifespan was Park Chung Hee, he was assassinated in 1979 at the age of 61. All presidents have lived above the age of 60. 8 presidents were in their 60s when they assumed office, 2 were in their 70s, and 4 were below 60. 61 years is the mean, median and modal age of presidents at assumption of office, it is also the modal age upon leaving office, as 3 presidents were 61 when they left office. Only Chun Doo-hwan was below 60 when he left office. The oldest president at the end of his tenure was Rhee Syng-man at 85.

Roh Moo-hyun retirement of 1 year, 88 days is the shortest in South Korea's history, Chun Doo-hwan's retirement of 33 years is the longest in South Korea's history. At age 84, Lee Myung-bak is the oldest of the five living presidents. Yun Po-sun who died in 1990 aged 92 is the nation's longest-lived president. Three presidents (Yun, Chun and Rhee) lived into their 90s, 4 died in their 80s, and 2 in their 60s. Lee Jae-myung, the current president, is also the youngest living president at age 62. The youngest living former president is Yoon Suk Yeol, age 65.

== List of presidents by age at assuming office ==
This is a list of presidents of South Korea by age at assuming office from the youngest to the oldest.

Name	Date of birth	Date of death	Date and age at assuming office
Park Chung Hee	14 November 1917	26 October 1979	24 March 1962 (aged 44)
Chun Doo-hwan	18 January 1931	23 November 2021	1 September 1980 (aged 49)
Roh Tae-woo	4 December 1932	26 October 2021	25 February 1988 (aged 55)
Roh Moo-hyun	1 September 1946	23 May 2009	25 February 2003 (aged 56)
Choi Kyu-hah	16 July 1919	22 October 2006	26 October 1979 (aged 60)
Park Geun-hye	2 February 1952	(living)	25 February 2013 (aged 61)
Yoon Suk Yeol	18 December 1960	(living)	10 May 2022 (aged 61)
Lee Jae-myung	8 December 1963	(living)	4 June 2025 (aged 61)
Yun Po-sun	26 August 1897	18 July 1990	13 August 1960 (aged 62)
Moon Jae-in	24 January 1953	(living)	10 May 2017 (aged 64)
Kim Young-sam	20 December 1927	22 November 2015	25 February 1993 (aged 65)
Lee Myung-bak	19 December 1941	(living)	25 February 2008 (aged 66)
Rhee Syng-man	26 March 1875	19 July 1965	24 July 1948 (aged 73)
Kim Dae-jung	6 January 1924	18 August 2009	25 February 1998 (aged 74)

== List of presidents by longevity ==
This table shows presidents by their longevity (living presidents in gold).

Rank	President	Date of birth	Date of death	Longevity (Years, Days)	Longevity (Days)
1	Yun Po-sun	26 August 1897	18 July 1990	92 years, 326 days	33,928 days
2	Chun Doo-hwan	18 January 1931	23 November 2021	90 years, 309 days	33,182 days
3	Rhee Syng-man	26 March 1875	19 July 1965	90 years, 115 days	32,987 days
4	Roh Tae-woo	4 December 1932	26 October 2021	88 years, 326 days	32,468 days
5	Kim Young-sam	20 December 1927	22 November 2015	87 years, 337 days	32,114 days
6	Choi Kyu-hah	16 July 1919	22 October 2006	87 years, 98 days	31,875 days
7	Kim Dae-jung	6 January 1924	18 August 2009	85 years, 224 days	31,271 days
8	Lee Myung-bak	19 December 1941	Living	84 years, 326 days	31,007 days
9	Park Geun-hye	2 February 1952	Living	74 years, 281 days	27,310 days
10	Moon Jae-in	24 January 1953	Living	73 years, 290 days	26,953 days
11	Yoon Suk Yeol	18 December 1960	Living	65 years, 327 days	24,068 days
12	Lee Jae-myung	8 December 1963	Living	62 years, 337 days	22,983 days
13	Roh Moo-hyun	1 September 1946	23 May 2009	62 years, 264 days	22,910 days
14	Park Chung Hee	14 November 1917	26 October 1979	61 years, 346 days	22,626 days

List of presidents of South Korea	14
Living	5
Deceased	9

== South Korean president's ages ==
This table charts the age of each president of South Korea at the time of assuming office, upon leaving office, and at the time of death. Where the president is still living, their lifespan and post presidential timespan are calculated up to 10 November 2026.

No.	President	Date of birth	Date of assuming office	Age at assuming office	End of term	Age at end of term	Length of retirement	Date of death	Lifespan
1	Rhee Syng-man	26 March 1875	24 July 1948	73 years, 120 days	26 April 1960	85 years, 31 days	5 years, 84 days	19 July 1965	32,987 days (90 years, 115 days)
2	Yun Po-sun	26 August 1897	13 August 1960	62 years, 353 days	24 March 1962	64 years, 210 days	28 years, 116 days	18 July 1990	33,928 days (92 years, 326 days)
3	Park Chung Hee	14 November 1917	24 March 1962	44 years, 130 days	26 October 1979	61 years, 346 days	0 days (Note: Died in office)	26 October 1979	22,626 days (61 years, 346 days)
4	Choi Kyu-hah	16 July 1919	26 October 1979	60 years, 102 days	16 August 1980	61 years, 31 days	26 years, 67 days	22 October 2006	31,875 days (87 years, 98 days)
5	Chun Doo-hwan	18 January 1931	1 September 1980	49 years, 227 days	24 February 1988	57 years, 37 days	33 years, 272 days	23 November 2021	33,182 days (90 years, 309 days)
6	Roh Tae-woo	4 December 1932	25 February 1988	55 years, 83 days	24 February 1993	60 years, 82 days	28 years, 244 days	26 October 2021	32,468 days (88 years, 326 days)
7	Kim Young-sam	20 December 1927	25 February 1993	65 years, 67 days	24 February 1998	70 years, 66 days	17 years, 271 days	22 November 2015	32,114 days (87 years, 337 days)
8	Kim Dae-jung	6 January 1924	25 February 1998	74 years, 50 days	24 February 2003	79 years, 49 days	6 years, 175 days	18 August 2009	31,271 days (85 years, 224 days)
9	Roh Moo-hyun	1 September 1946	25 February 2003	56 years, 177 days	24 February 2008	61 years, 176 days	1 year, 88 days	23 May 2009	22,910 days (62 years, 264 days)
10	Lee Myung-bak	19 December 1941	25 February 2008	66 years, 68 days	24 February 2013	71 years, 67 days	13 years, 259 days	(living)	31,007 days (84 years, 326 days)
11	Park Geun-hye	2 February 1952	25 February 2013	61 years, 23 days	10 March 2017	65 years, 36 days	9 years, 245 days	(living)	27,310 days (74 years, 281 days)
12	Moon Jae-in	24 January 1953	10 May 2017	64 years, 106 days	9 May 2022	69 years, 105 days	4 years, 185 days	(living)	26,953 days (73 years, 290 days)
13	Yoon Suk Yeol	18 December 1960	10 May 2022	61 years, 143 days	4 April 2025	64 years, 107 days	1 year, 220 days	(living)	24,068 days (65 years, 327 days)
14	Lee Jae-myung	8 December 1963	4 June 2025	61 years, 178 days	(Incumbent)	(Incumbent)	N/A	(living)	22,983 days (62 years, 337 days)
No.	President	Date of birth	Date of assuming office	Age at assuming office	End of term	Age at end of term	Length of retirement	Date of death	Lifespan

== Graphical representation ==
This is a graphical lifespan timeline of presidents of South Korea as well as their terms in the National Assembly. The presidents are listed in order of office.
