= List of Presidents of the United States who did not seek re-election =

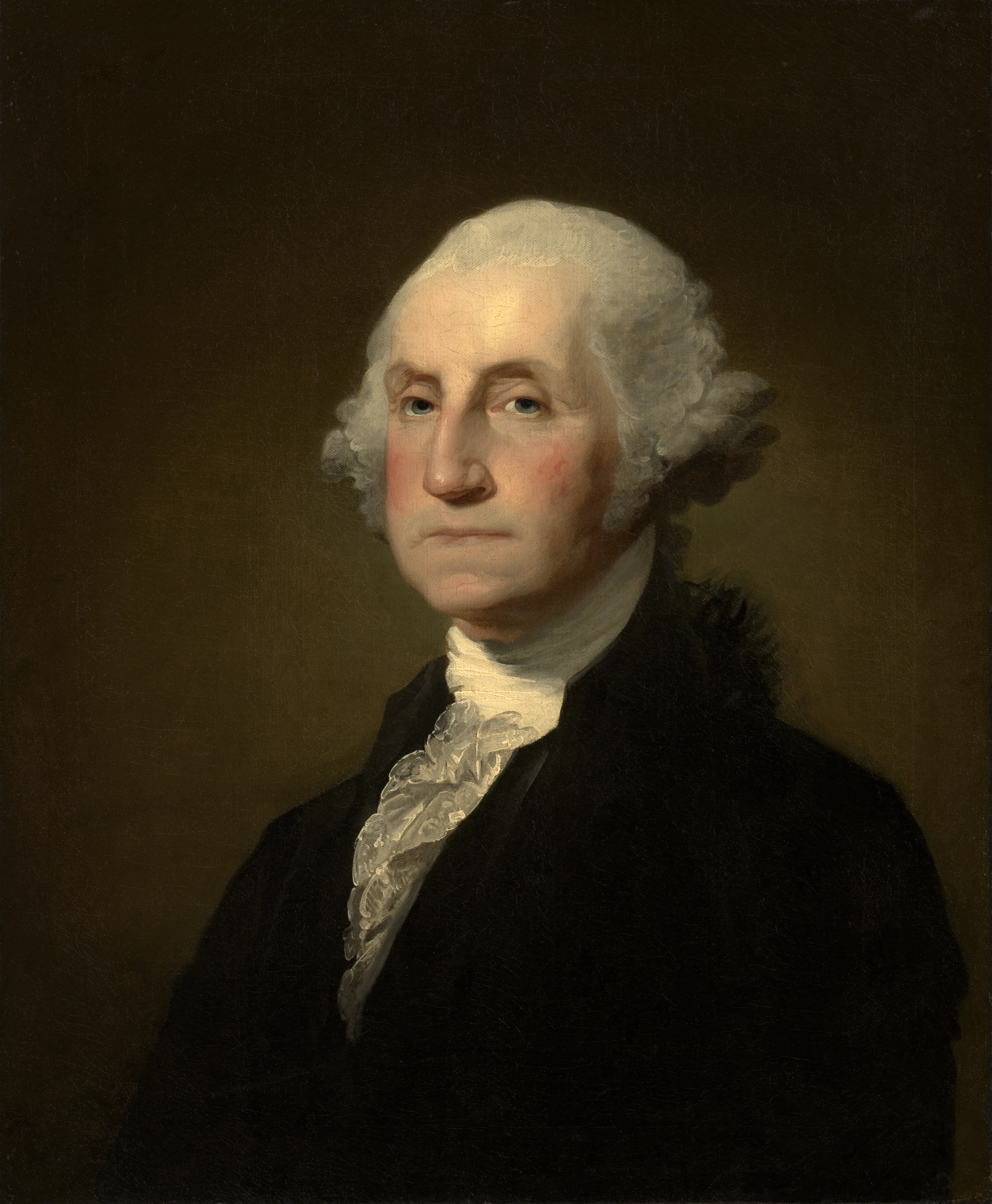
George Washington established the precedent and tradition of U.S. presidents only serving two terms, and then voluntarily relinquishing the office.

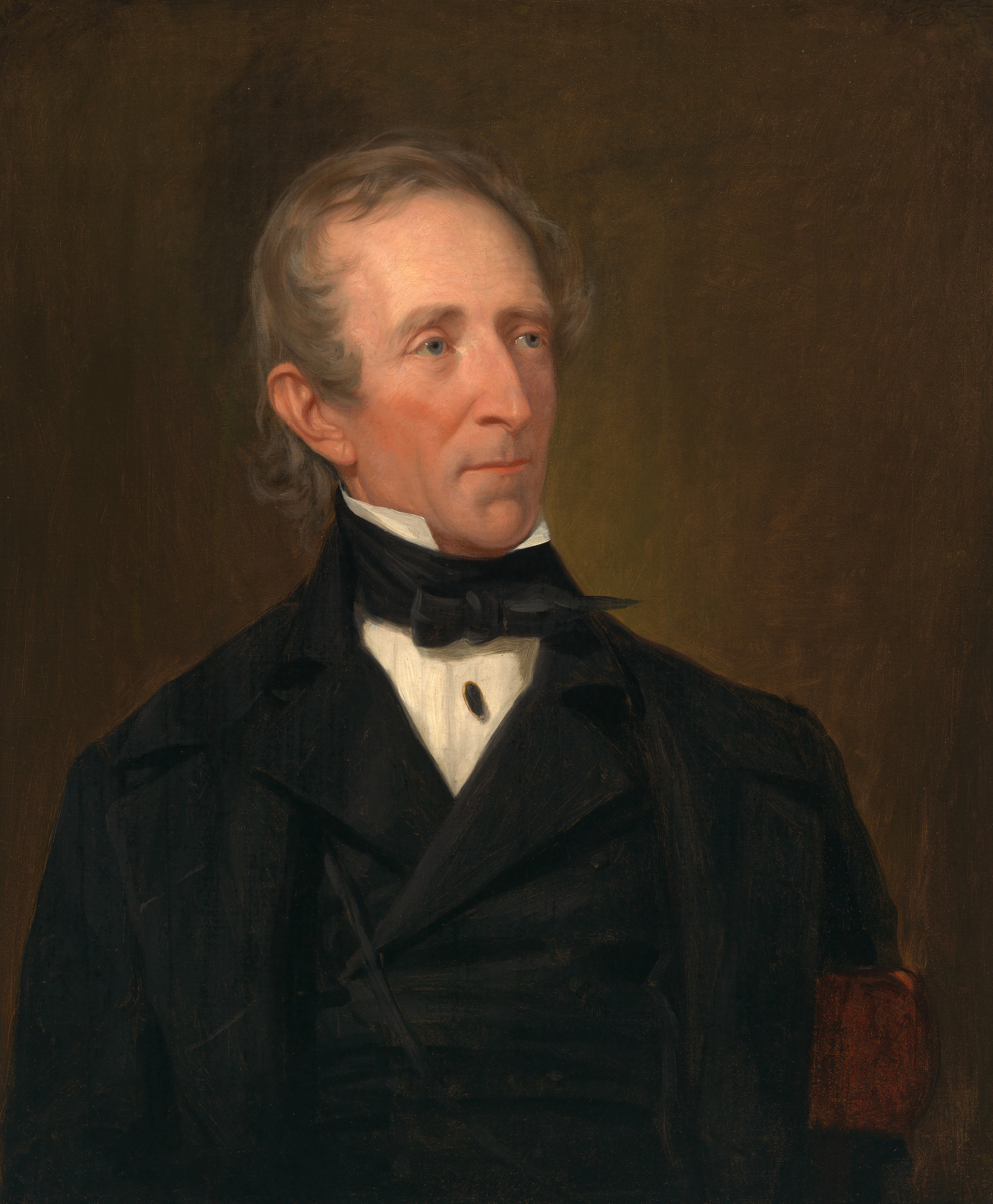
John Tyler was the first U.S. president to decline to seek re-election after serving a single term in office.

The president of the United States is the head of state and head of government of the United States, indirectly elected to a four-year term via the Electoral College. Since 1951, under the 22nd Amendment to the Constitution of the United States, no person may serve more than two full terms as the U.S. president (or one term if they have served over two years of a partial term). Prior to the term limit, all U.S. presidents (except Ulysses S. Grant and Theodore Roosevelt nonconsecutively, and Franklin D. Roosevelt consecutively) followed an informal two-term tradition set by George Washington and Thomas Jefferson.

The following U.S. presidents (listed below) were eligible for a second or third full term, but chose not to seek the presidency in the general election, although several sought to run as a candidate in party primaries.

== Before 22nd amendment ==
- George Washington (in office 1789–1797).
- Thomas Jefferson (in office 1801–1809).
- James Madison (in office 1809–1817).
- James Monroe (in office 1817–1825).
- Andrew Jackson (in office 1829–1837).
- John Tyler (in office 1841-1845): withdrew from the race to support Polk.
- James K. Polk (in office 1845–1849): kept campaign promise to serve only one term.
- James Buchanan (in office 1857–1861): kept campaign promise to serve only one term.
- Rutherford B. Hayes (in office 1877–1881): kept campaign promise to serve only one term. (Note: Unless he had unanimous support.)
- Grover Cleveland (Note: Nonconsecutive second term.) (in office 1885–1889 / 1893–1897).
- Woodrow Wilson (in office 1913–1921): Wilson hoped to be nominated at the 1920 Democratic National Convention, but ultimately was not, and decided not to run after suffering a severe stroke while in office.
- Calvin Coolidge (in office 1923–1929): chose not to run after serving one partial term and one full term.

== After 22nd amendment ==
- Harry S. Truman (in office 1945–1953 (Note: A grandfather clause exemption was made for the president serving when the 22nd amendment was passed (during Truman's presidency) by Congress.)): withdrew from the race after serving one partial term and one full term.
- Lyndon B. Johnson (in office 1963–1969 (Note: Johnson was eligible for a third term because his first term, in which he replaced John F. Kennedy after the latter's assassination, lasted less than two years.)): withdrew from the race after serving one partial term and one full term.
- Joe Biden (in office 2021–2025): withdrew from the race after serving one full term and earning his party’s nomination.
