= List of presidents of Finland by time in office =

This is a list of presidents of Finland by their time in office. For a consecutive list, see list of presidents of Finland.

== List ==
| President | Length of term | Took office | Left office | Note |
|---|---|---|---|---|
| Urho Kekkonen | 25 years, 332 days | 1 March 1956 | 27 January 1982 | 4 terms serving, 3rd longer and last shorter than normal • resigned due to poor health |
| Mauno Koivisto | 12 years, 33 days | 27 January 1982 | 1 March 1994 | 2 terms serving, 1st slightly over a month longer than normal |
| Tarja Halonen | 12 years, 0 days | 1 March 2000 | 1 March 2012 | 2 terms serving |
| Sauli Niinistö | 12 years, 0 days | 1 March 2012 | 1 March 2024 | 2 terms serving, 1st one month shorter (but normal) |
| J. K. Paasikivi | 9 years, 356 days | 11 March 1946 | 1 March 1956 | 2 terms serving, 1st shorter than normal |
| Martti Ahtisaari | 6 years, 0 days NOTE: 2192 days, due to two leap days: 29 February; 1996 and 2000 | 1 March 1994 | 1 March 2000 | 1 term serving |
| Lauri Kristian Relander | 6 years, 0 days NOTE: 2191 days, due to one leap day: 29 February 1928 | 2 March 1925 | 2 March 1931 | 1 term serving |
| P. E. Svinhufvud | 5 years, 364 days NOTE: 2191 days, due to two leap days: 29 February; 1932 and 1936 | 2 March 1931 | 1 March 1937 | 1 term serving, one day shorter (but normal) |
| K. J. Ståhlberg | 5 years, 219 days | 26 July 1919 | 2 March 1925 | 1 term serving, slightly under five months shorter than normal |
| Kyösti Kallio | 3 years, 293 days | 1 March 1937 | 19 December 1940 | 1 term serving, shorter than normal • resigned due to poor health |
| Risto Ryti | 3 years, 229 days | 19 December 1940 | 4 August 1944 | 2 terms serving, both shorter than normal • resigned due to the Ryti–Ribbentrop Agreement |
| Alexander Stubb | 2 years, 249 days | 1 March 2024 | | 1 term serving |
| Gustaf Mannerheim | 1 year, 219 days | 4 August 1944 | 11 March 1946 | 1 term serving, shorter than normal • resigned due to poor health |

== Gallery ==
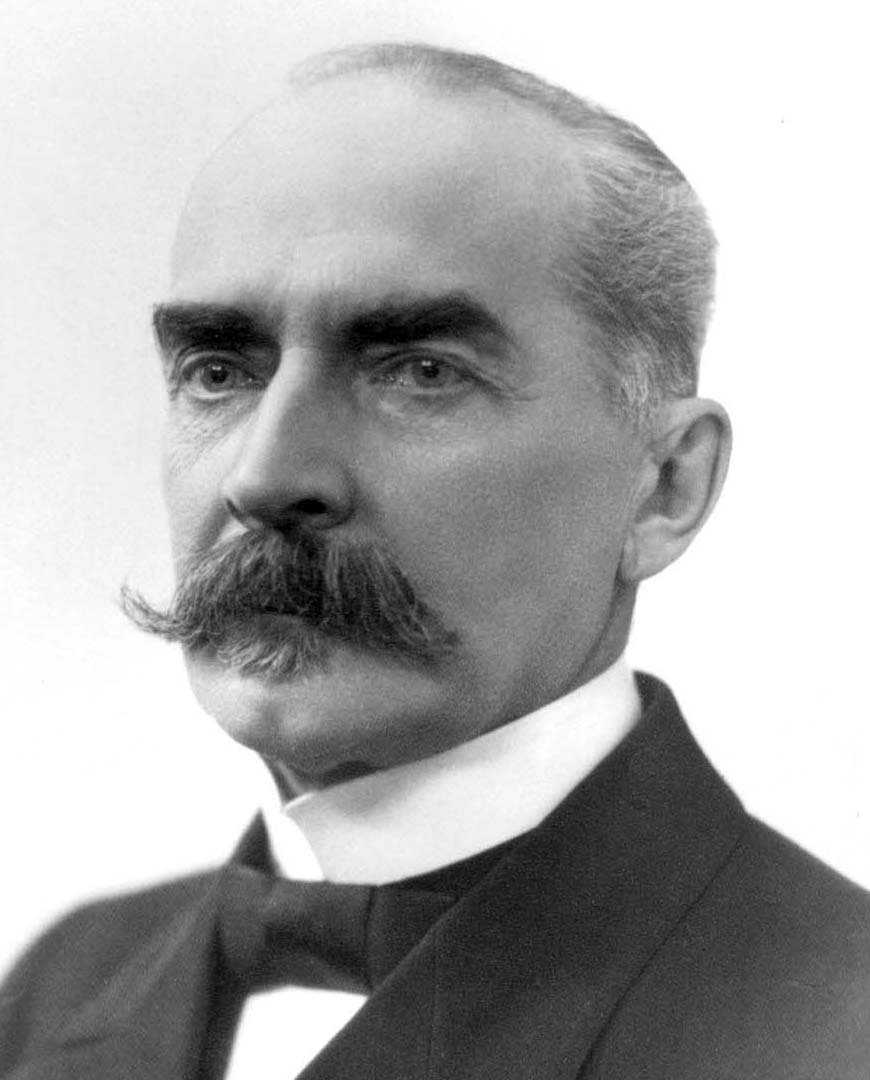
K. J. Ståhlberg

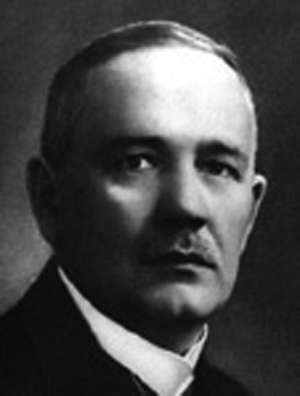
Lauri Kristian Relander

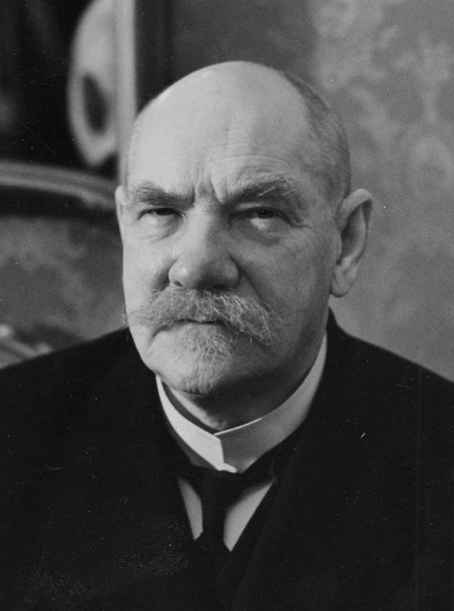
P. E. Svinhufvud

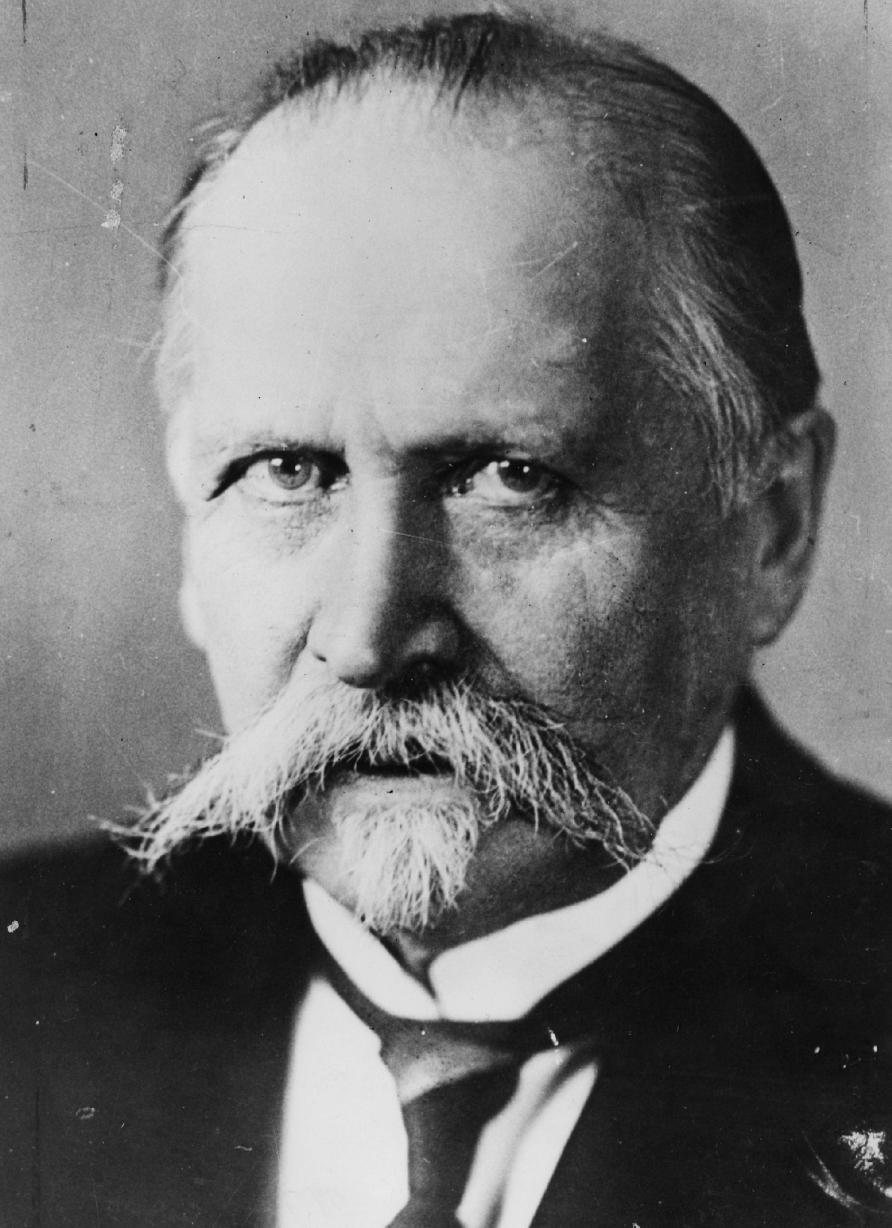
Kyösti Kallio

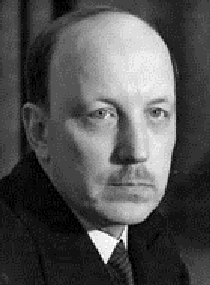
Risto Ryti

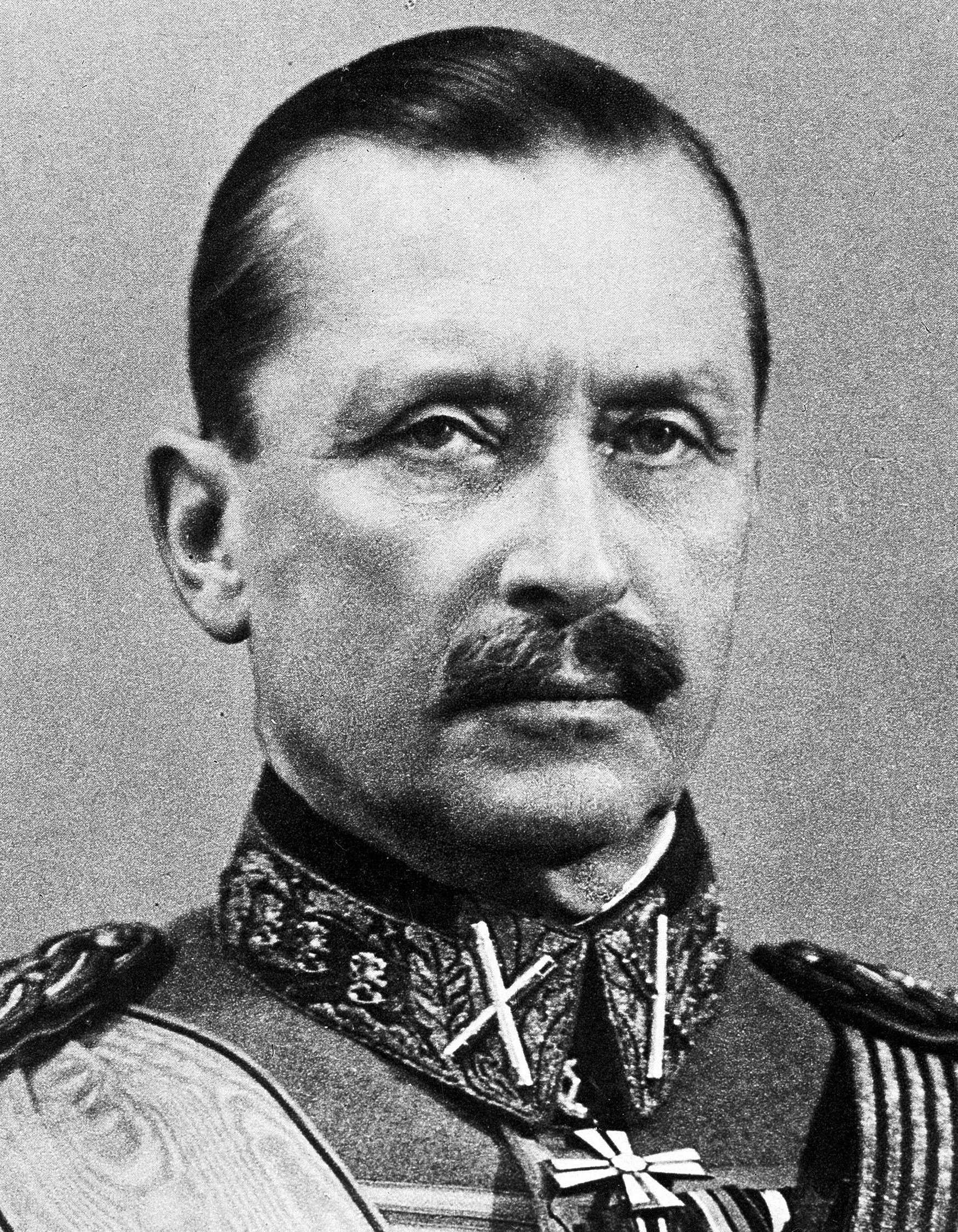
Gustaf Mannerheim

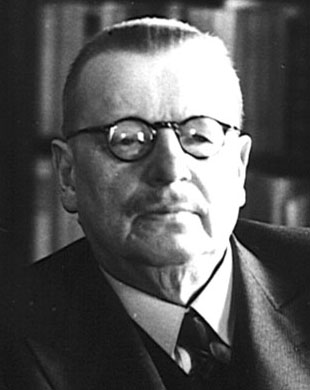
Juho Kusti Paasikivi

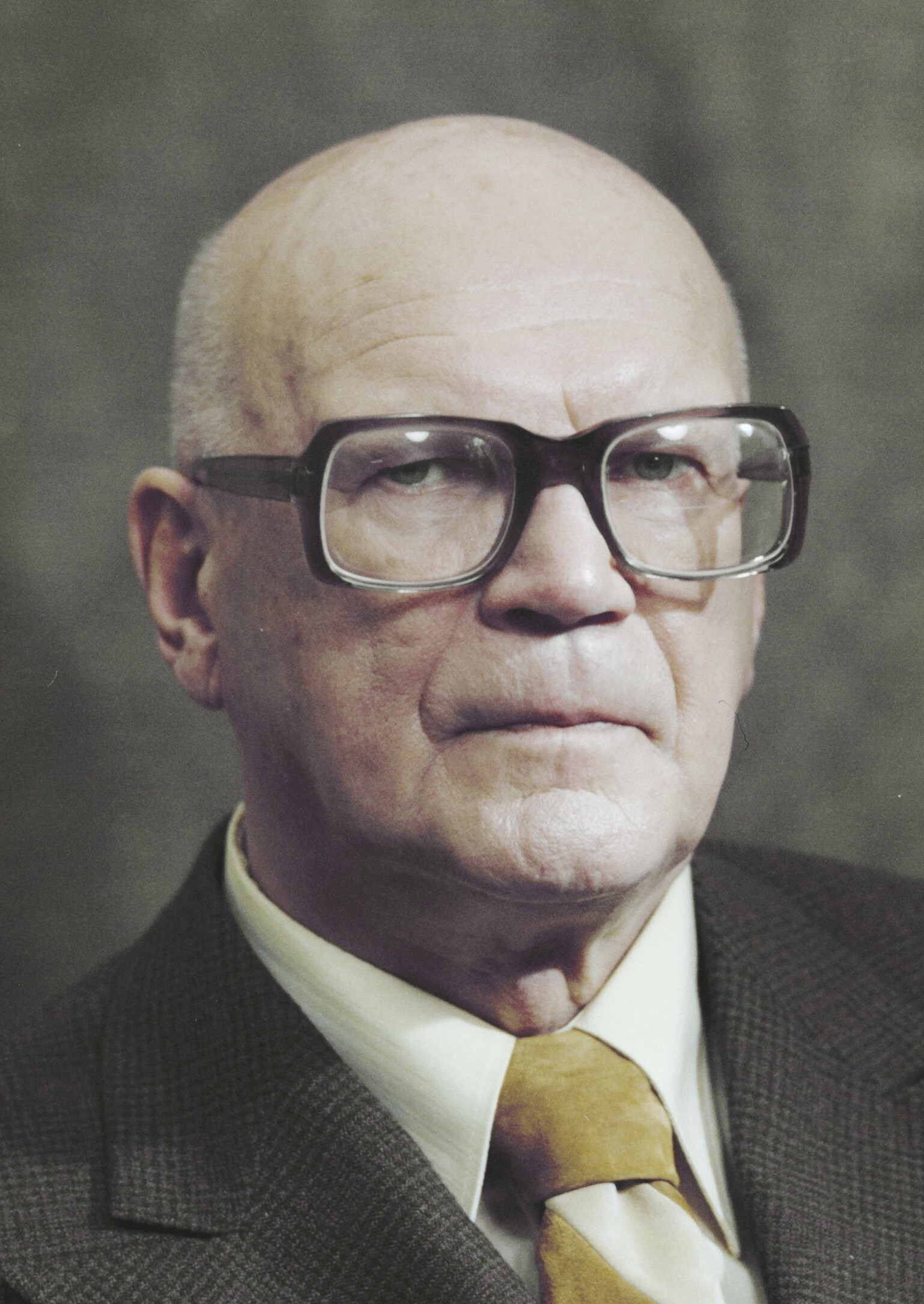
Urho Kekkonen

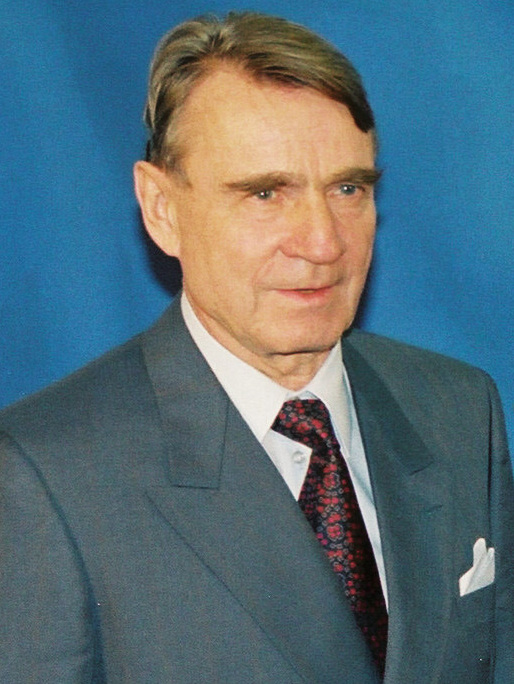
Mauno Koivisto

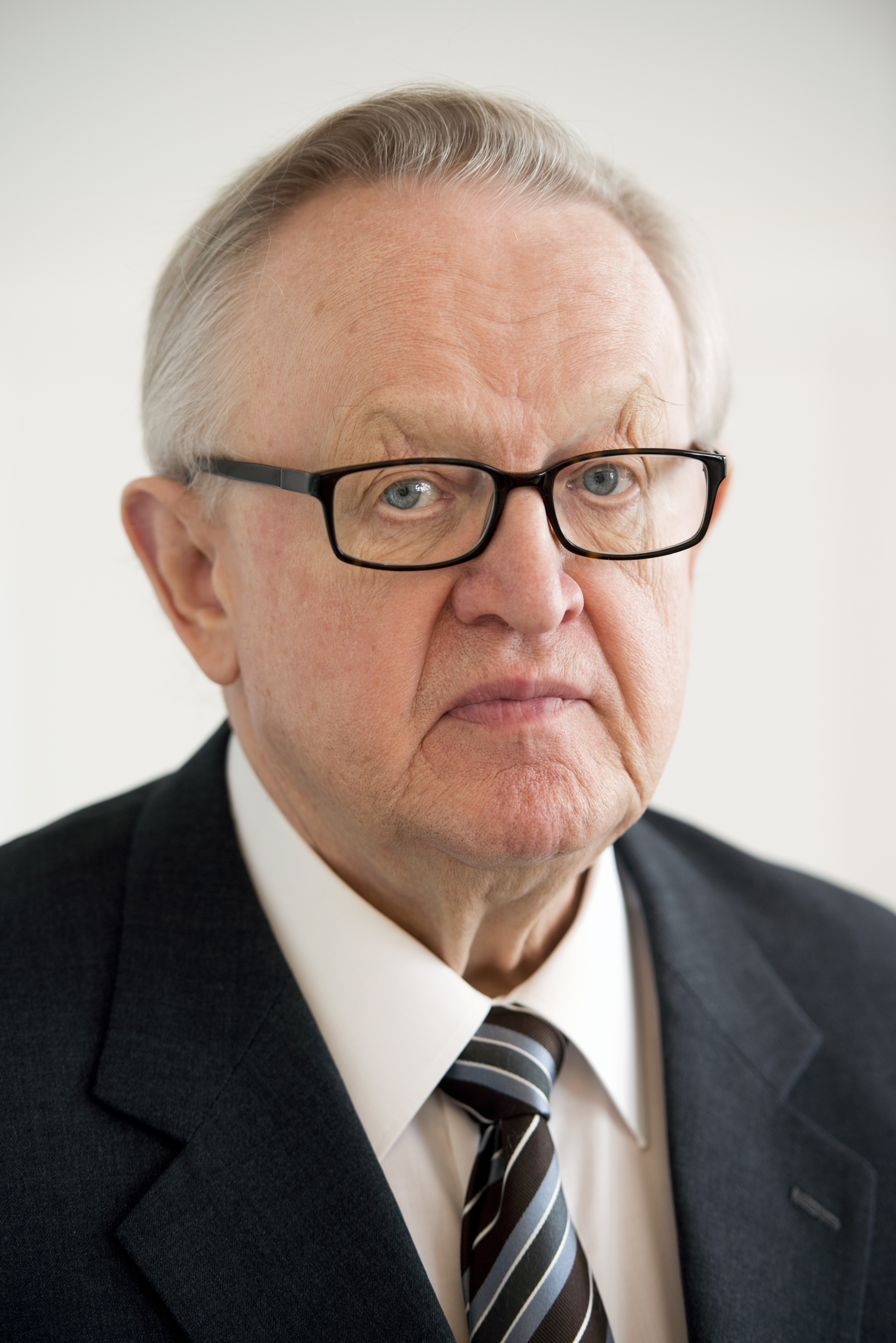
Martti Ahtisaari

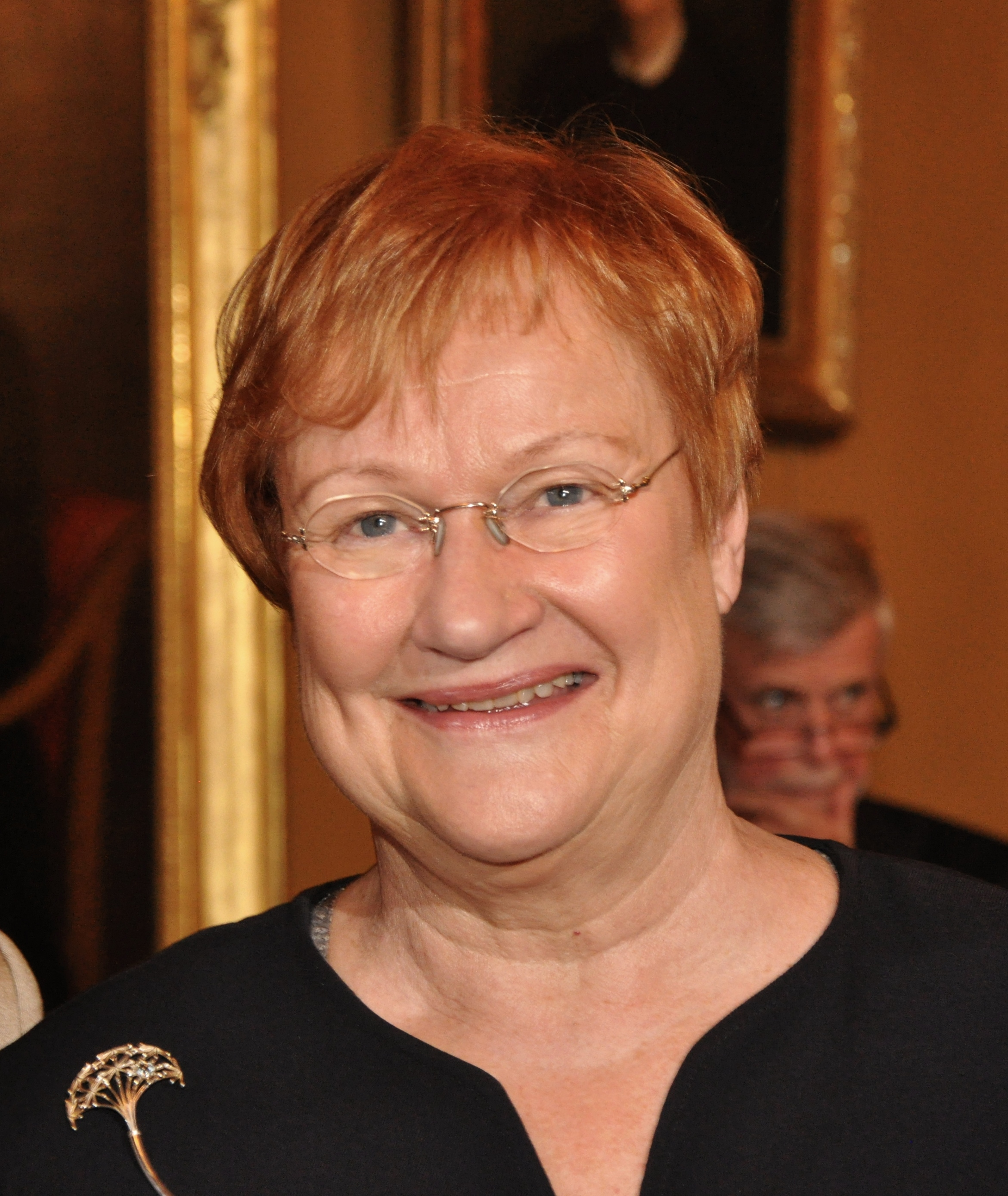
Tarja Halonen

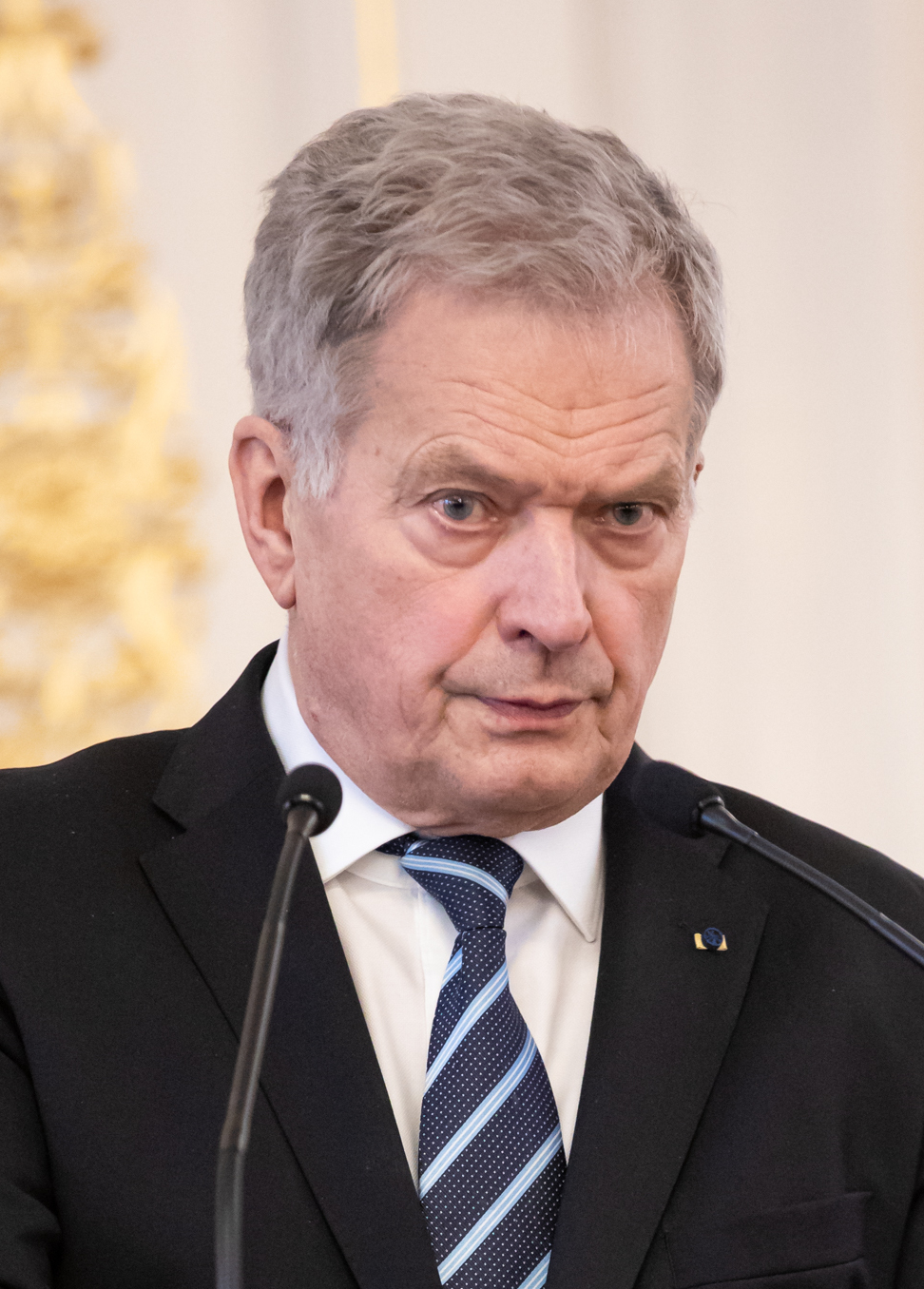
Sauli Niinistö

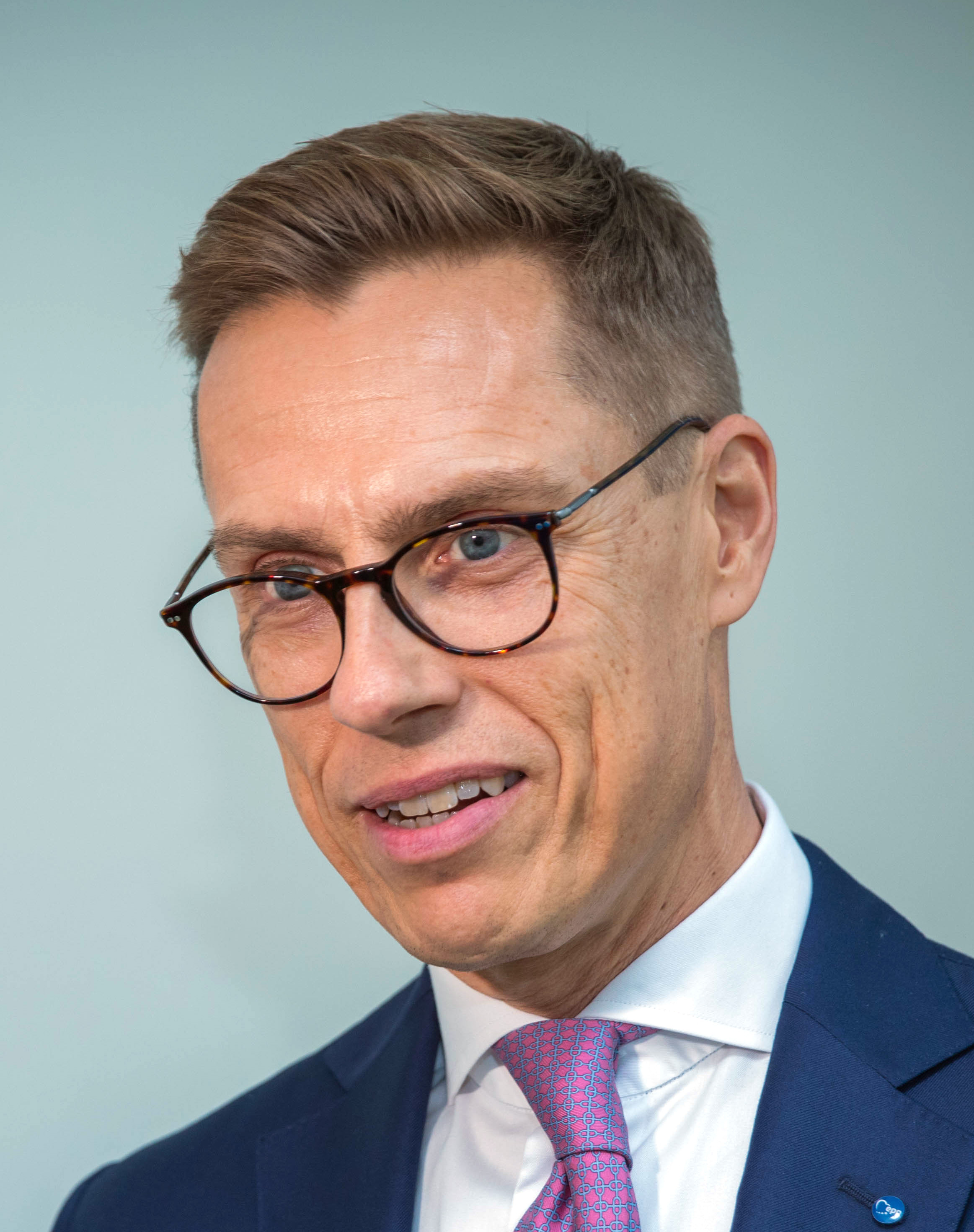
Alexander Stubb

== See also ==
- President of Finland
- List of presidents of Finland
