= David Harvey (structural engineer) =

British structural engineer

David Harvey FIStructE
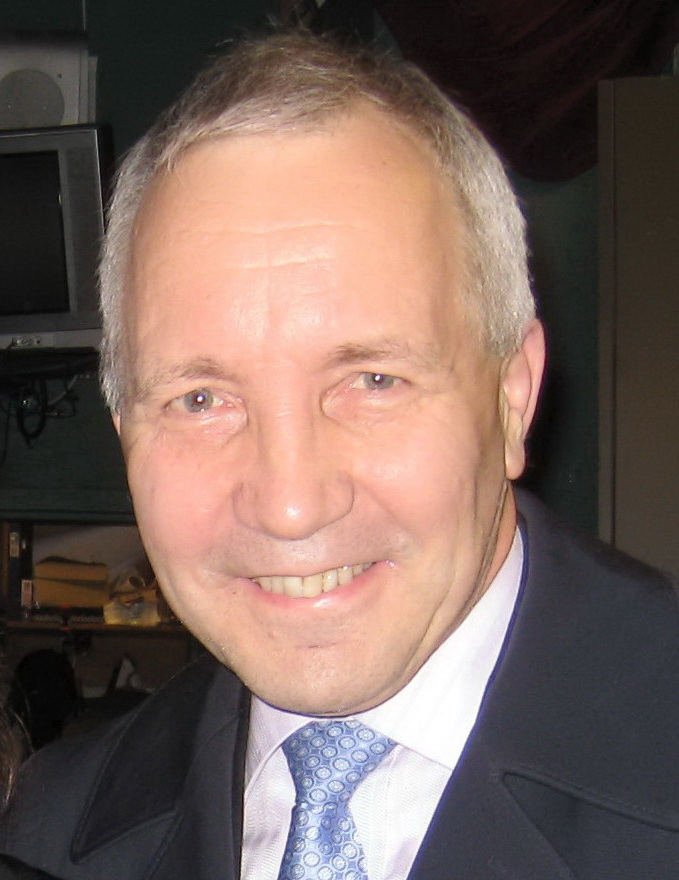
- Born: 1947 (age 78–79); Gloucestershire, England
- Education: University of Bristol
- Engineering career
- Discipline: Structural engineer
- Institutions: Institution of Structural Engineers; Structural Engineers Association of British Columbia
- Practice name: Associated Engineering
- Projects: Athabasca River (Suncor) Bridge, Fort McMurray, Alberta; MacKay River Bridge, Fort McMurray, Alberta; Pitt River Bridge, Port Coquitlam, BC; Alexandra Bridge Restoration, Spuzzum, BC; Burrard Bridge Restoration, Vancouver, BC
- Awards: R.A. McLachlan Memorial Award, 2009 – Engineers and Geoscientists British Columbia

David Harvey is a British structural engineer who emigrated to Canada in 1982 to work as a bridge engineer in Vancouver, British Columbia.

== Early life and education ==
Harvey was born in Gloucestershire, England, and read civil engineering at the University of Bristol.

== Career ==
After graduating in 1969, Harvey joined Owen Williams to design highways. He moved to Freeman Fox in 1971, and one of his first jobs was check the temporary works for the Milford Haven Bridge. After researching orthotropic bridge decks at the University of Bristol he worked on the Ogmore Viaduct, the San Fernando to Princess Town Highway in Trinidad, the Assafar Motorway in Kuwait, and the River Hayle Viaduct in Cornwall.

In 1981 he joined Associated Engineering in Vancouver, which was developing its bridge design capability at the time. This led Harvey to designing low-volume road bridges in remote regions using industrial-style methods under design/build contracts. This work included some milestone industrial bridges including the Athabasca River Bridge for Suncor Energy, the McKay River Bridge, the Iguana Creek submersible bridge in Belize, and specialized bridges to carry some of the world’s largest moving loads. He also worked on many highway bridges for the Province of British Columbia, including the 2009 Pitt River Bridge.

He has lately worked on restoration of heritage bridges; particularly the Alexandra Bridge (Trans-Canada), and the City of Vancouver’s Burrard Bridge and Granville Street Bridge. Harvey was the 86th President of the Institution of Structural Engineers in 2006-07, and the first to be living and working in Canada.

== Awards and honours ==
- R.A. McLachlan Memorial Award, 2009 – Engineers and Geoscientists British Columbia

== Selected projects ==
- King George Flyover, Surrey, BC
- Nine Mile Canyon Bridge Rehabilitation, Boston Bar, BC
- Athabasca River (Suncor) Bridge, Fort McMurray, Alberta
- McKay River Bridge, Fort McMurray, Alberta
- Iguana Creek Bridge, Belize
- Pitt River Bridge, Port Coquitlam, BC
- Alexandra Bridge (Trans-Canada) restoration, Spuzzum, BC
- Burrard Bridge restoration, Vancouver, BC.
