= Jacqueline Dunnley-Wendt =

British theatre director

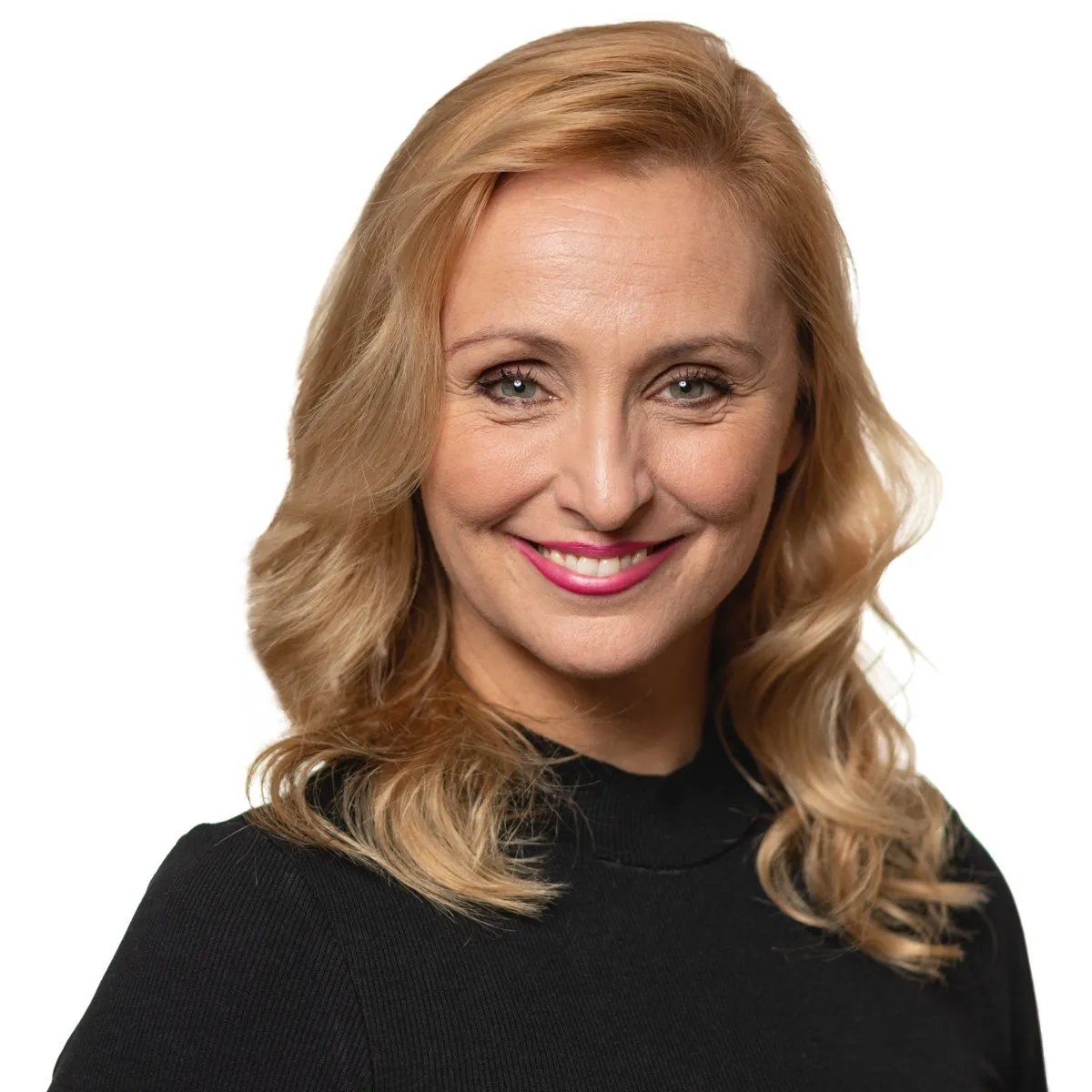
- Dunnley-Wendt in 2023
- Born: January 21, 1971 (age 55); Birmingham, U.K.
- Occupations: Theatre director, choreographer, teacher, performer
- Years active: 1990–present
- Spouse: Hauke Wendt

Jacqueline Dunnley-Wendt (born 21 January 1971) is a British-German theatre director, choreographer, performer and teacher.

== Life ==
Born Jacqueline Dunn in Birmingham, England, she attended her first dance lessons at the age of three at the Grove Lane School of Dance, and from the age of five at the Suzette School of Dance; later she received preparatory lessons at Bojangles Dance in Lichfield.

She studied classical ballet, jazz dance, tap, modern dance, contemporary dance (Graham technique), drama, singing and dance education at The Urdang Academy of Ballet and Performing Arts in Covent Garden, London. She graduated with a diploma in Teaching Musical Theatre and an Associate Teaching Certificate from the Imperial Society of Teachers of Dancing and the Royal Society of Arts.

Due to the requirements of the Actor's Equity Association, she adopted the name Jacqueline Dunnley for the stage, which since her marriage has been Jacqueline Dunnley-Wendt, often referred to as Jacqui Dunnley-Wendt. In addition to her British citizenship, she has held German citizenship since 2020.

She is the artistic director of MCE shows as well as the artistic and pedagogical director of the Ahrensburg Musical Theatre School.

Jacqueline Dunnley-Wendt is married to the musician, conductor and theatre producer Hauke Wendt. They have two sons together and live in Ahrensburg near Hamburg.

== Stage productions ==
=== As actress and dancer ===
- 1990 Birmingham Superprix
- 1990 Amitabh Bachchan Bollywood Concert at Wembley Stadium
- 1990 Fashion Hair Show, London
- 1990 Cinderella Pantomime, Tunbridge Wells
- 1991 Summer Season, Clacton-on-Sea
- 1991 Jack and the Beanstalk Pantomime, Piccadilly Theatre London
- 1992 Wot a Carry On, North Pier Blackpool
- 1992 The Russ Abbott Show, North Pier Blackpool
- 1992 Goldilocks and the three Bears Pantomime, Wimbledon Theatre London
- 1993 Cats, Operettenhaus Hamburg
- 1995 Buddy – The Buddy Holly Story, Neue Metropol Musicaltheater Hamburg
- 1995 Disney's Beauty and the Beast, Raimundtheater Wien
- 1997 Disney's Beauty and the Beast, Dominion Theatre London
- 1998 Buddy – the Musical, Neue Metropol Musicaltheater Hamburg
- 1999 Joseph and the Amazing Technicolor Dreamcoat, Colosseum Theater Essen
- 2000 Disney's Beauty and the Beast, Palladium Theater Stuttgart
- 2001 Cats, Palladium Theater Stuttgart
- 2001 Disney's Beauty and the Beast, International Tour (UK und Irland)
- 2003 Cats, Capitol Theater Düsseldorf und Tournee
- 2007 Stage Entertainment's Best of Musical Tour

=== Creative team work ===
- 2001 Disney's Beauty and the Beast, International Tour (UK und Irland), Dance Captain and Assistant Resident Director
- 2003 Cats, Tournee, Resident Director
- 2004 Disney's Beauty and the Beast, LG Arts Centre Seoul, Assistant Choreographer
- 2005 Witchcraft - The Magic of Cy Coleman, Capitol Theater Düsseldorf, Original production, Director and Choreographer
- 2008 Disney's Beauty and the Beast, Teatro Montecasino Johannesburg und Artscape Opera Cape Town, Associate Director and Associate Choreographer
- 2008 The Producers, Ronacher Wien, Assistant Choreographer
- 2009 Disney's Beauty and the Beast, Teatro Abril São Paulo, Associate Director and Associate Choreographer
- 2010 High Fidelity, Folkwang Universität der Künste Essen, Original German production, Choreographer
- 2010 Disney's Beauty and the Beast, Teatro Ópera Buenos Aires, Associate Director and Associate Choreographer
- 2013 Disney's Camp Rock, Kampnagel Hamburg, Original German production, Director and Choreographer
- 2014 Hairspray JR, Kampnagel Hamburg, Director and Choreographer
- 2014 Cabaret, Kammeroper Köln, Director and Choreographer
- 2014 24-Stunden Musicals, Alfred-Rust-Saal Ahrensburg, Original German production, Director and Choreographer
- 2015 Mord am Mikro!, MCE Shows, Choreographer
- 2015 24-Stunden Musicals, Alfred-Rust-Saal Ahrensburg, Director and Choreographer
- 2016 42nd Street, First Stage Theater Hamburg, Director and Choreographer
- 2016 King Kong, MCE Shows, Director and Choreographer
- 2016 Disney in Concert, tour, Assistant Choreographer
- 2016 24-Stunden Musicals, Alfred-Rust-Saal Ahrensburg, Artistic Director
- 2017 Disney in Concert: Magic Moments, tour, Choreographer
- 2017 Disney in Concert: The Jungle Book, tour, Director and Choreographer
- 2017 Chicago, First Stage Theater Hamburg, Director and Choreographer
- 2018 Disney in Concert: Wonderful Worlds, tour, Associate Director and Choreographer
- 2019 Rumplestiltskin, MCE Shows, Director and Choreographer
- 2022 Disney in Concert: Dreams Come True, tour, Associate Director and Choreographer
- 2022 Knockin' on Heaven's Door, Theater für Niedersachen Hildesheim, Choreographer
- 2023 Disney 100 - The Concert, tour, Director and Choreographer
- 2023 Abbamania The Show, tour, Director and Choreographer
- 2023 Re-opening show of Alsterschwimmhalle Hamburg, Choreographer
- 2023 Gangsta Granny, Theater Lübeck, Choreographer

== Teaching ==
- Musicalschule Ahrensburg, Artistic and Educational Director
- Folkwang Universität der Künste Essen
- The Showa University of Music Tokio / Showa Academia Musica
- International College of Musical Theatre (ICMT)
- The Urdang Academy London
- Den Danske Scenekunstskole Fredericia
- Liz Mohn Kultur- und Musikstiftung
- Stahlberg Trust
