= Walter Neuhäusser =

German architect (1926–2021)

- Walter Neuhäusser, in c. 2000
- Born: 9 October 1926; Oberbrechen, Germany
- Died: 16 January 2021 (aged 94); Limburg, Germany
- Education: Städelschule
- Occupations: Architect; Preservationist
- Organizations: Association of German Architects; Deutscher Werkbund
- Awards: Villa Massimo

Walter Neuhäusser (or Neuhäußer; 9 October 1926 – 16 January 2021) was a German architect, preservationist and teacher. He was known for shell buildings, participating in the Alsterschwimmhalle in Hamburg, designing the funeral chapels in Schupbach and Obertiefenbach, and St. Hildegard in Limburg. He was instrumental in the restoration of timber-framed buildings in Limburg including the Römer 2-4-6 complex.

== Life and career ==
Neuhäusser was born in Oberbrechen on 9 October 1926, the son of the conductor and composer Joseph Neuhäuser and his wife Rosa née Ricker. He first trained as a culture engineering technician (Kulturbautechniker) at the Limburg Kulturamt. In 1943 he was drafted to Arbeitsdienst, and then to the Wehrmacht in Normandy. He was a prisoner of war in Cherbourg until 1946, when he returned to his position in Limburg. He achieved his Abitur at the Goethegymnasium in Frankfurt and was one of the first students of architecture at the Städelschule there. He became a master student of Johannes Krahn in 1954. He assisted Krahn in his firm while finishing his studies.

After work in several Frankfurt firms including Krahn's, Neuhäusser founded his first firm in Limburg in 1957; he built three residential buildings for customers Meyer, Freise and Wiegand. The buildings are regarded as influenced by Klassische Moderne and functionalism, but he also used rounded and fluent forms. His first major project was the Landschaftsbad (landscape bath) in 1960, which was not only a swimming pool but also included landscape design. Using new technologies, the open pool is integrated in nature, serving as a model for similar projects. Due to a restricted budget, materials were intentionally simple. They would have needed maintenance, and some structures had to be replaced.

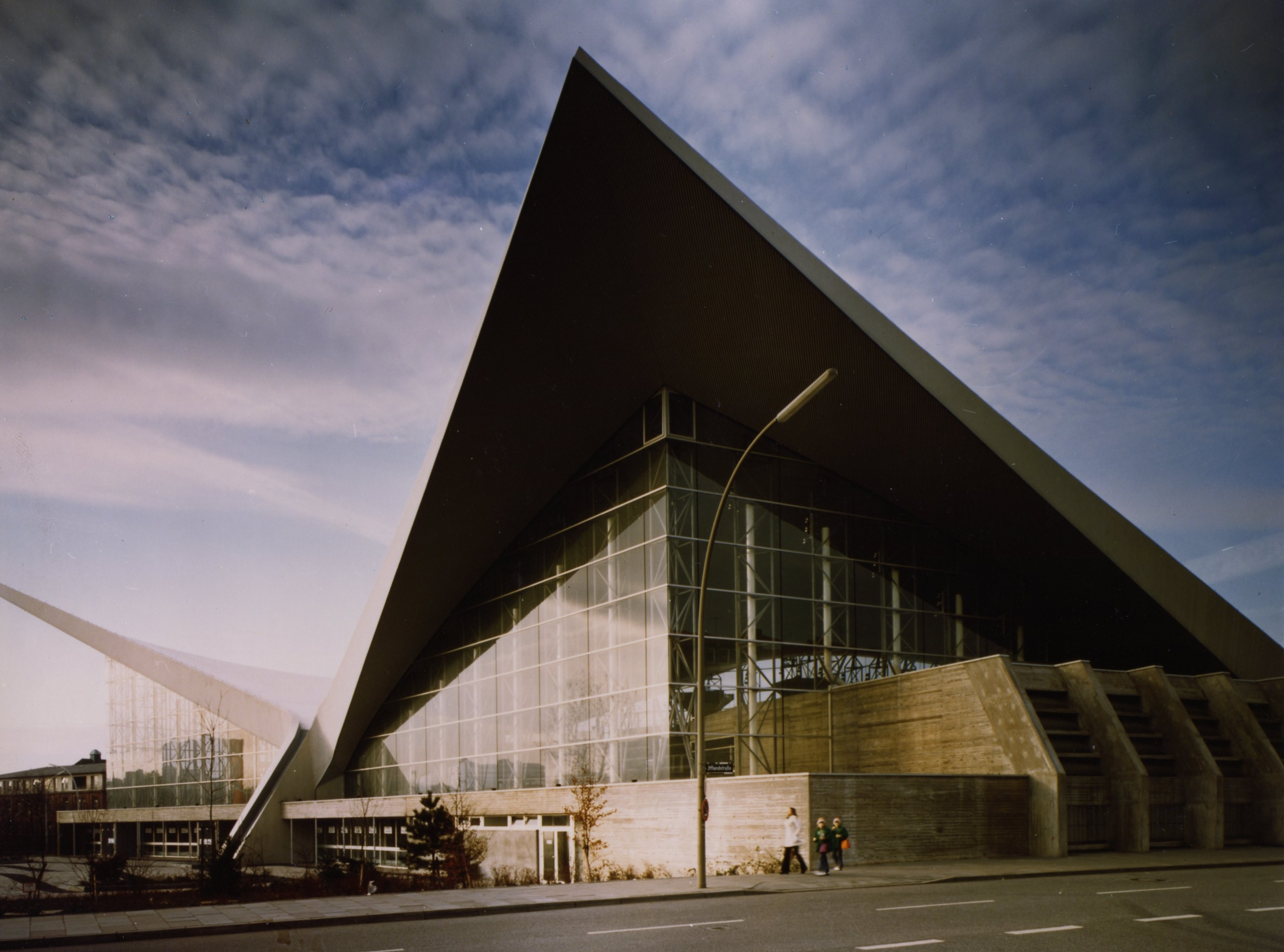
Alsterschwimmhalle, Hamburg

Neuhäusser was interested in shell building, therefore he was consulted for the project Alsterschwimmhalle in Hamburg for which colleagues had won a competition. He revised the plans. In similar technique, he designed the complex around the church of St. Hildegard in Limburg and several smaller structures such as cemetery halls. The hyperbolic paraboloid roof of the Alsterschwimmhalle is listed as a protected structure by Germany's Office for the Preservation of Historic Monuments. It has been described as "an outstanding example of Hamburg's post-war architecture" and was the subject of an extensive refurbishment in the early 2020s. It was shortlisted for the sustainable renovation category of the 2024 Dezeen Awards.

Neuhäusser also became an expert in the preservation of historic half-timbered buildings. His first preservation project was in 1962 the Springiersbach abbey, a monastery dating back to 1135. He was from 1972, together with Hildegard Schirmacher and Franz Josef Hamm, instrumental in the restoration of the old town of Limburg also in his position as city councillor. He was responsible especially for the Römer 2-4-6 complex, and for the Walderdorffer Hof. The project in Limburg served as a model for others such as the revitalization of Marburg's old town.

Neuhäusser lectured at the Glasfachschule in Hadamar for Konstruktiver Glasbau. From 1975 he lectured as a guest for two years at the Fachhochschule Koblenz, focused on shell building and Faltwerk.

Neuhäusser became a member of the Association of German Architects in 1961. He was elected to the Deutscher Werkbund in 1976. He was awarded a Villa Massimo scholarship in 1976. He ran his last firm with Axel Schmitt in Limburg from 1990, who continued in his spirit when he retired in 2000. He served on the Denkmalbeirat (a local advisory council on monuments) of the city of Limburg.

=== Personal life ===
Neuhäusser was married; the couple had two children.

Neuhäusser died at Limburg on 16 January 2021 at the age of 94.

== Work ==
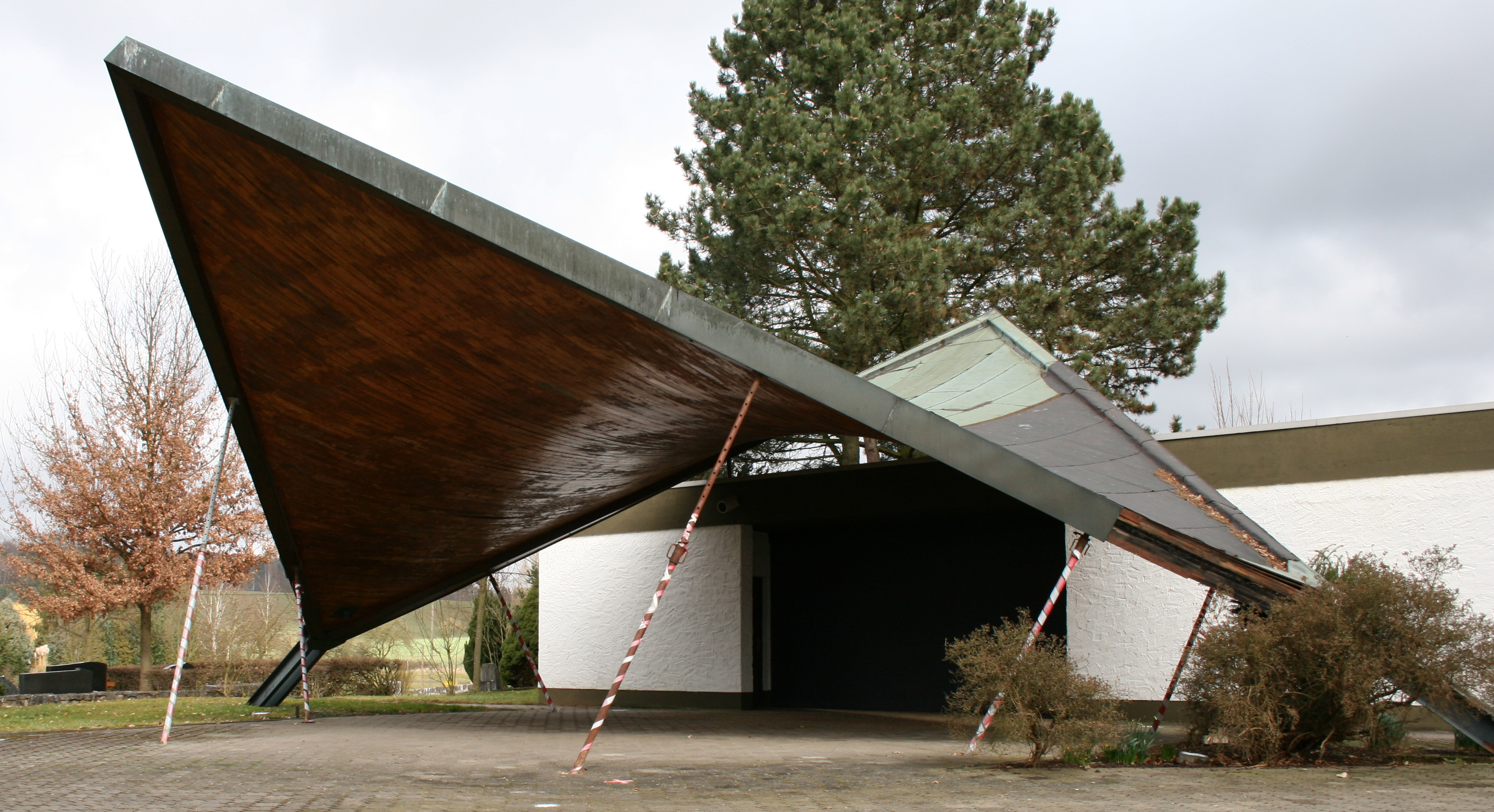
Schupbach cemetery hall – saddle roof

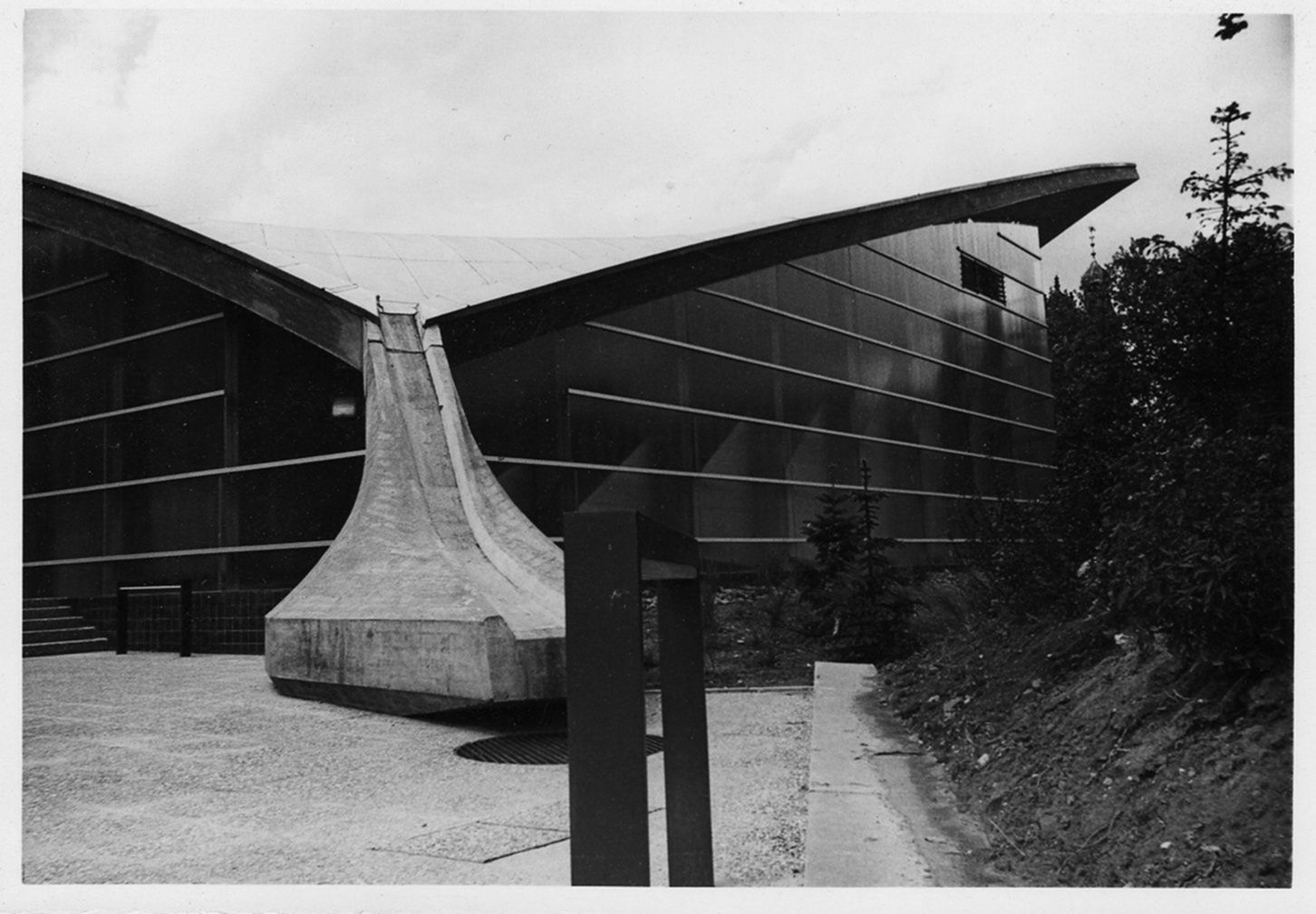
St. Hildegard

Neuäusser's works include:

- 1956: Limburg, Haus Meyer
- 1957: Limburg, Haus Freise
- 1957: Schupbach: Haus Wiegand
- 1960: Limburg, Landschaftsbad
- 1963: Limburg: St. Hildegard (Jugendkirche Crossover since 2005)
- 1964: Hamburg: Alsterschwimmhalle
- 1966: Schupbach: Cemetery hall (demolished)
- 1965: Wetzlar: Café Mocca Klaus (with Johannes Peter Hölzinger)
- 1968: Obertiefenbach: Trauerhalle
- 1970: Obertiefenbach: Haus Eder
- 1982: Cologne, Tonstudio Online
- 1992: Limburg: Walderdorffer Hof, restoration
- 1992: Frankfurt: Palmengarten (with Schirmacher)
- after 1990: Frankfurt: building of the Japanese congregation
