= Killesberg Tower =

Observation tower in Stuttgart, Germany

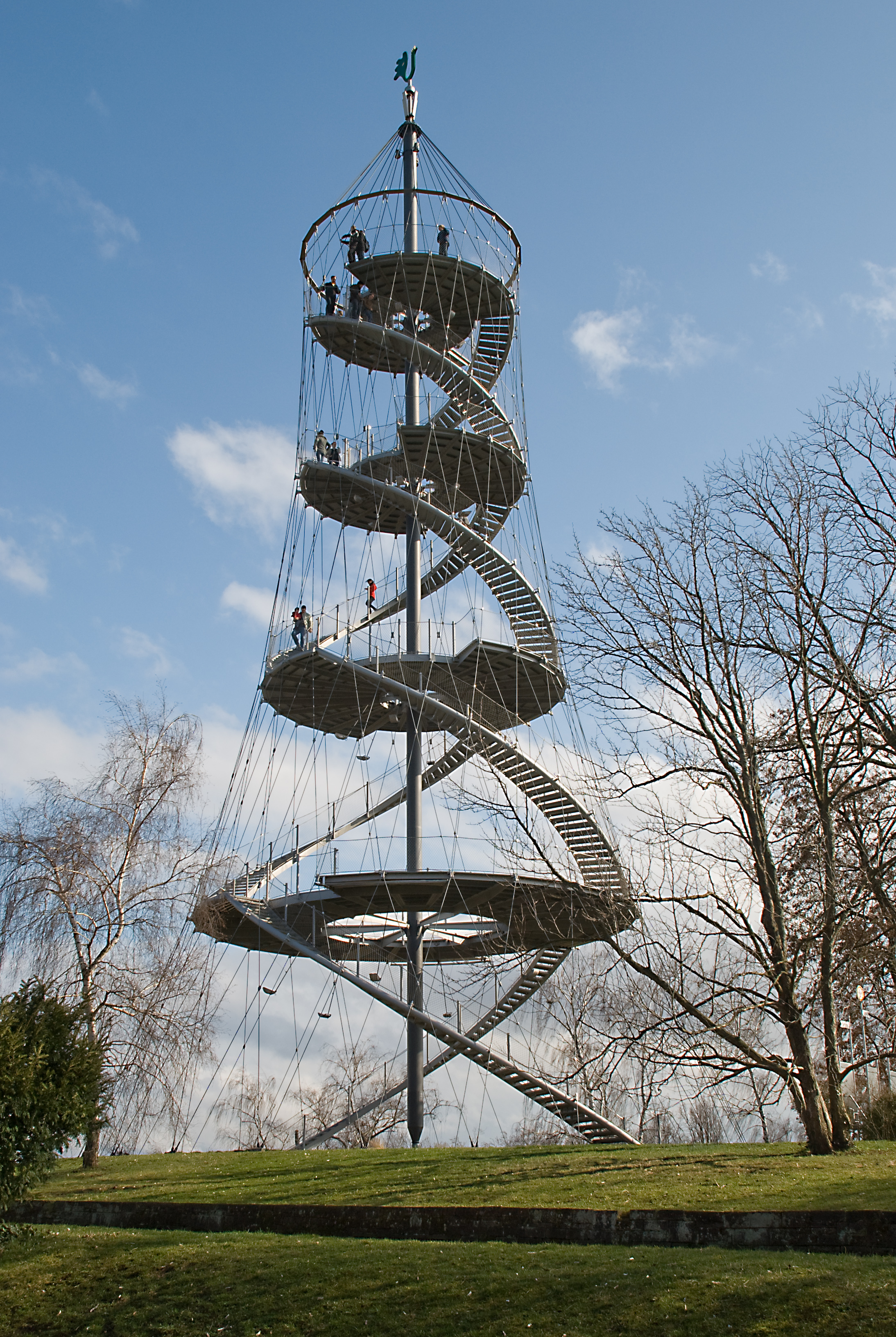
Killesberg Tower

The Killesberg Tower (called 'Killesbergturm' in German) is a 40-meter high observation tower located in the Killesberg Park in Stuttgart, Germany. Originally planned for the 1993 World Horticultural Exposition, an interruption in the design process delayed its erection until 8 years later in 2001.

== Predecessor ==
As early as for the 1939 German Horticultural Exposition an observation tower was planned. It was eventually erected in 1950 and dubbed Zaiser Tower after the company that donated it. At its tip, a radio transmitter was mounted. The Zaiser Tower was demolished in 1974 because the necessary funds for its renovation could not be raised.

== Guiding principle and objectives ==
In 1985 the City of Stuttgart received the contract for the 1993 World Horticultural Exposition (Internationale Gartenbauausstellung, IGA). In order to offer visitors an overview over a major part of the grounds, an artificial elevation was necessary. The site on the Killesberg where the previous tower had been located seemed suitable.

More difficult than finding a suitable location proved the search for an appropriate design. The tower should be delicate and fit into its surroundings. The ambitious objective was to prove that modern construction engineering can be environmentally friendly, even when the tower is high and features several large observation decks.

Eventually, Jörg Schlaich suggested a cable net construction based on the model of cable net cooling towers for power plants.

== Project history ==
The first plans were developed in 1986 and worked out in more detail until 1991. However, the Stuttgart city council stopped the project because the IGA management had exceeded their budget. Subsequently, the Verschönerungsverein Stuttgart (Embellishing Society) was asked for support. This organization had experience with local development programs as well as with collecting donations. In 1998, long after the IGA was finished, they had raised enough funds to start building the tower, among others by offering sponsorships to companies as well as private persons in exchange for mounting their name plates on individual tower steps. The tower was inaugurated on July 17, 2001.

== Design ==
Significant design elements of the tower are the central mast whose heel is hinged via a steel ball to the central foundation, and the steel cable net of triangular meshes. The net is tensioned between a circular concrete foundation and a pressure ring at an altitude of 33.5 meters which in turn is suspended from the mast head by cables.

The four observation decks at 8, 16, 24, and 31 meters are hinged to the mast and at their circumference connected to the net by press fittings.

The two spiral staircases, one for ascending, one for descending, are carried only by the cable net.

For the suspension and the net cables open spiral cables with diameter of 18 mm resp. 24 mm were used, consisting of 37 resp. 61 strands of 2.6 mm diameter. Their tensile strength is 1.57 kN/mm^{2}. Due to their relative high strength they are less susceptible to press forces exerted by the fittings, e.g. for the observation decks.

All cables and fittings are galvanized. In addition, all steel construction elements received a double paint coat. The hollow sections, i.e. the mast and the stair tubes, are galvanized on both their inner and outer surfaces.

== Access ==
Access to the park and the tower is free of charge. For the tower, a voluntary contribution is asked for. Opening hours are from 7 a.m. until nightfall.

== Images ==
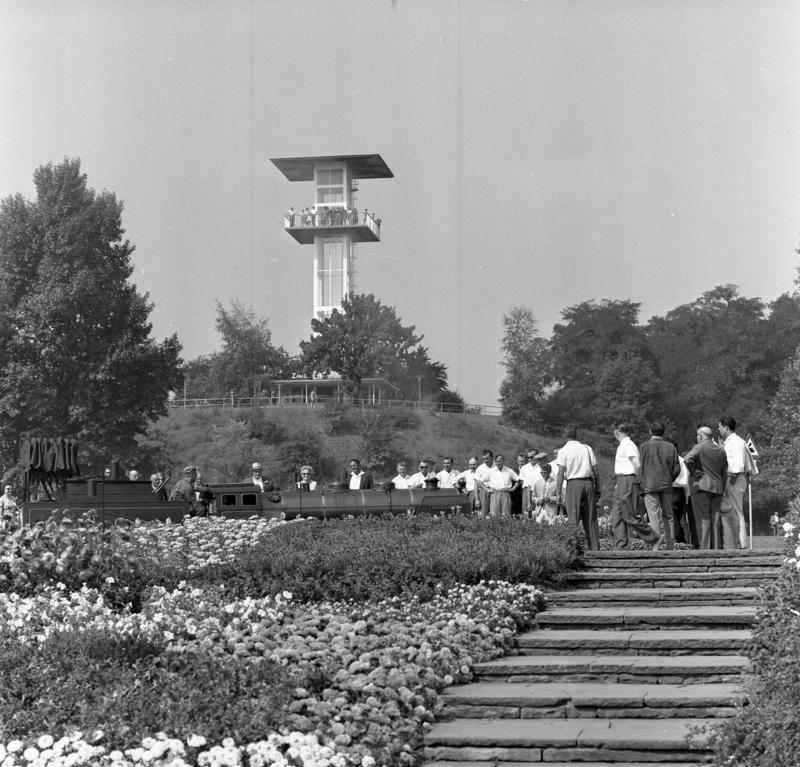
The first Killesberg Tower

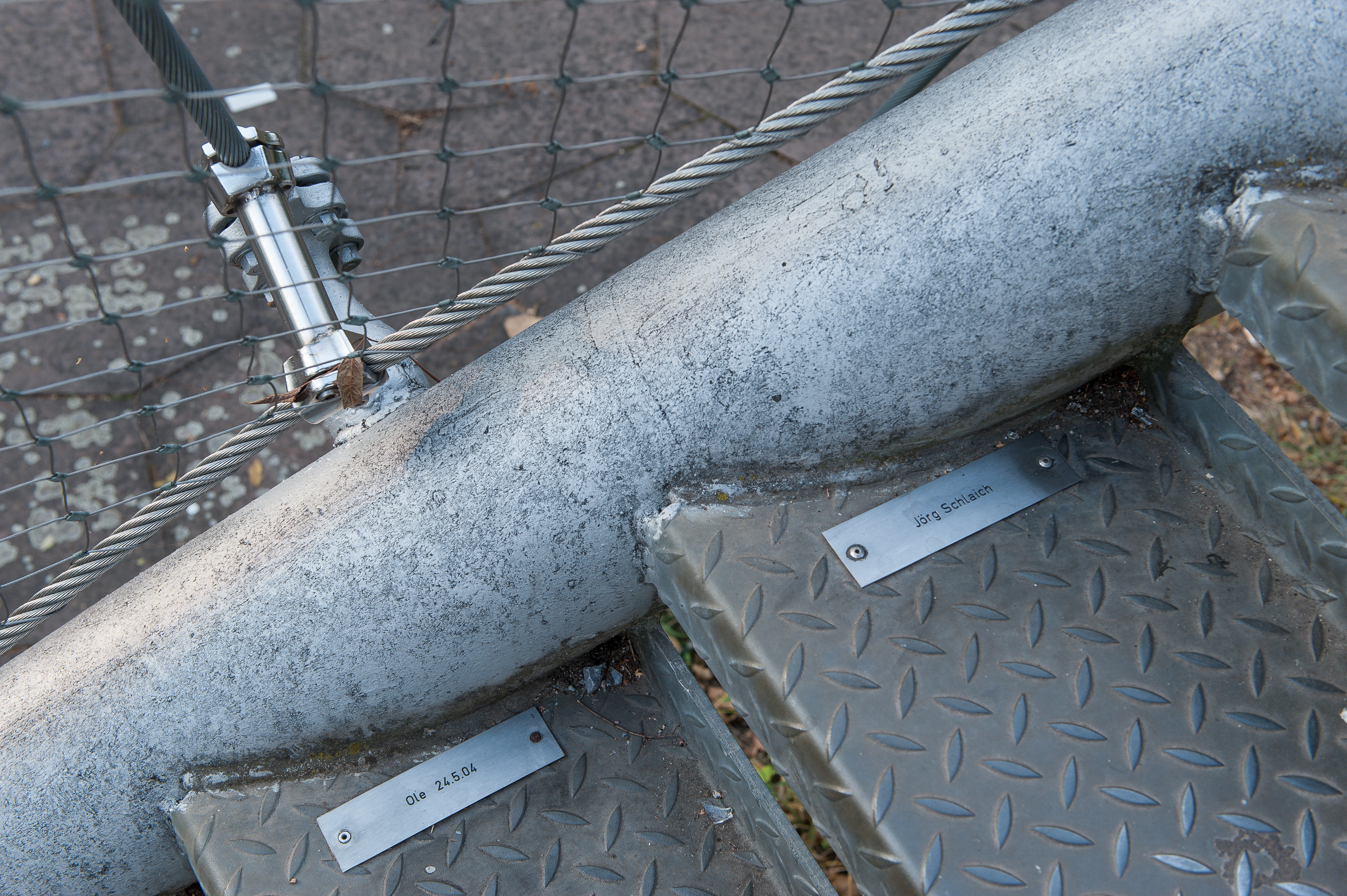
Steps with sponsorship plates

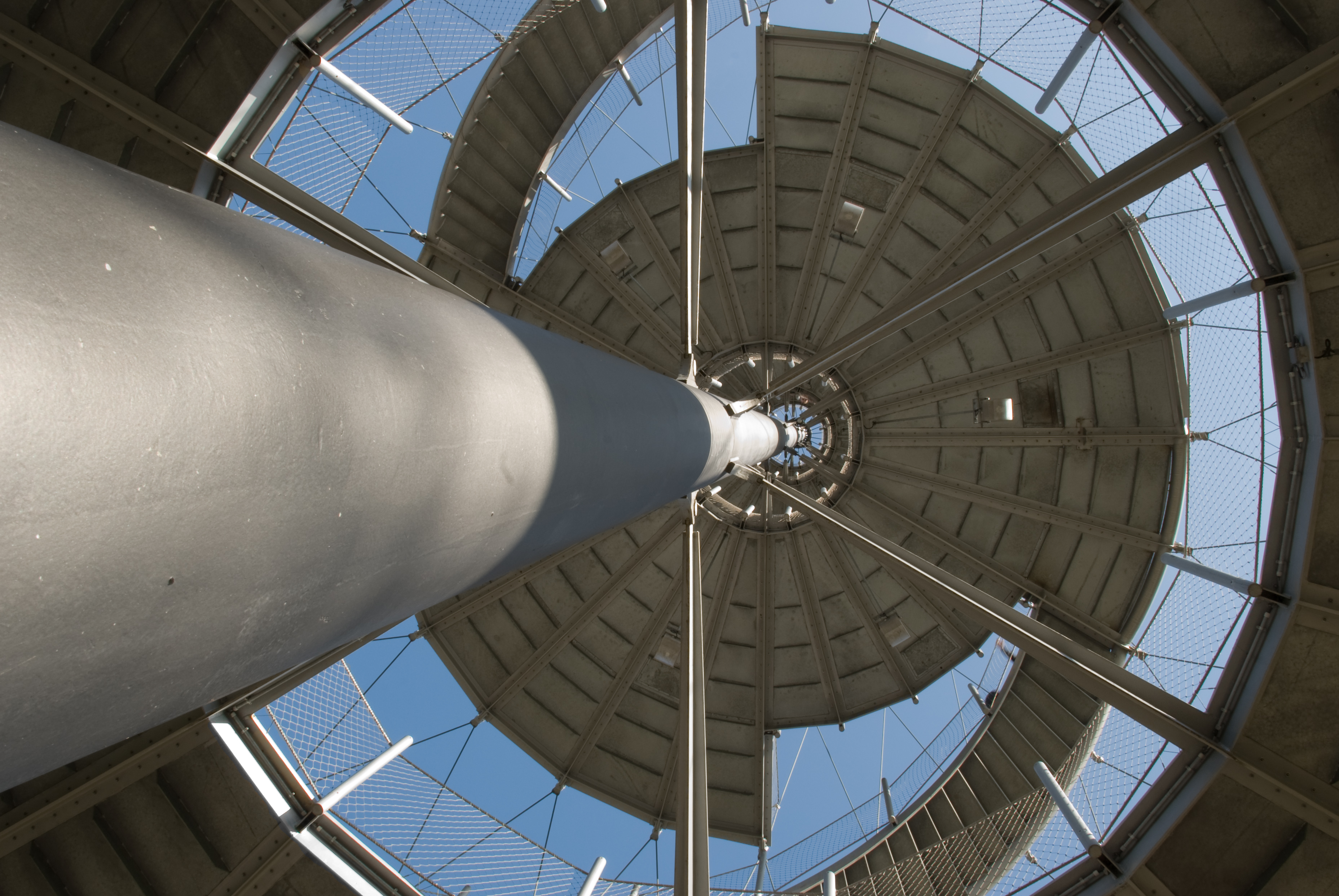
View from below

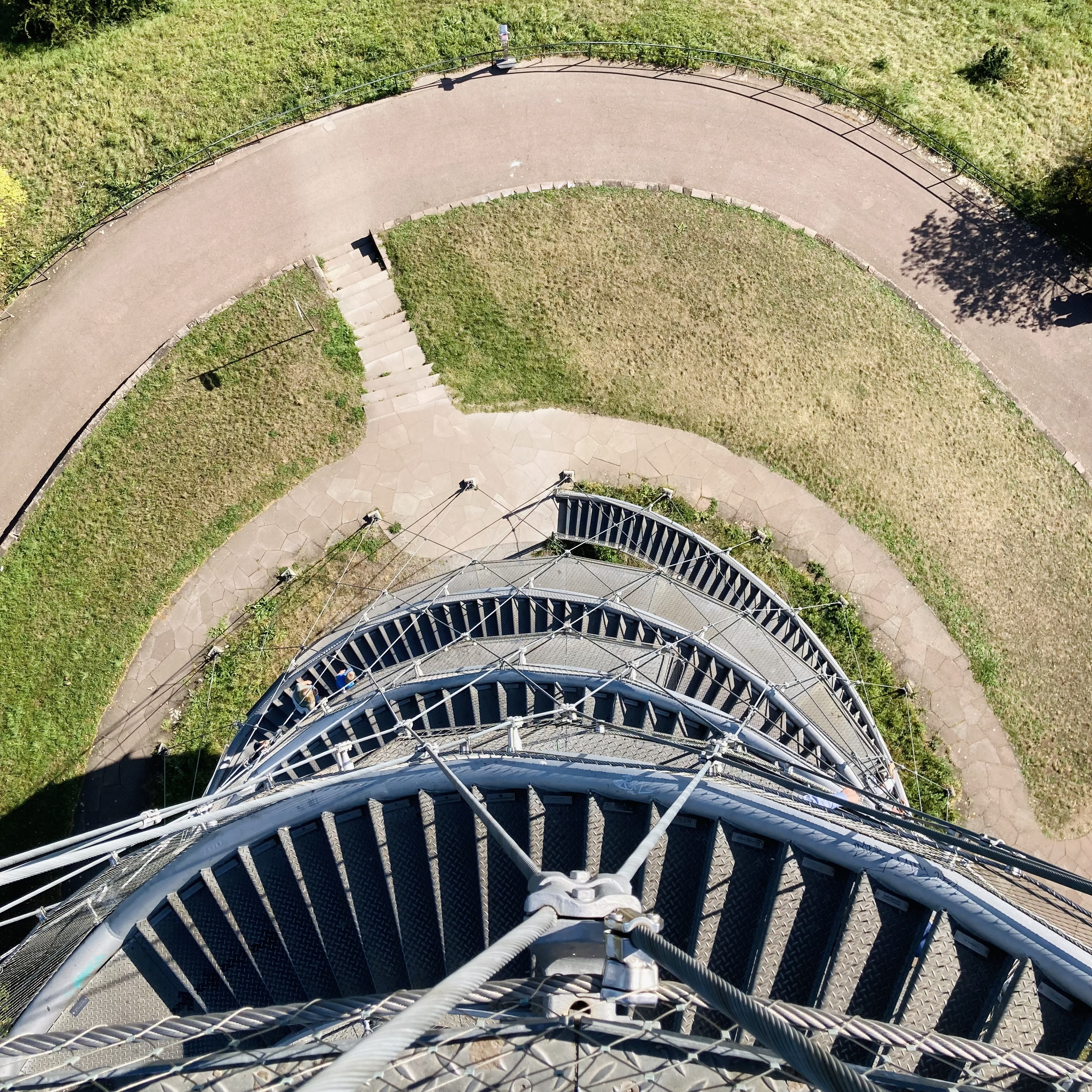
View from top

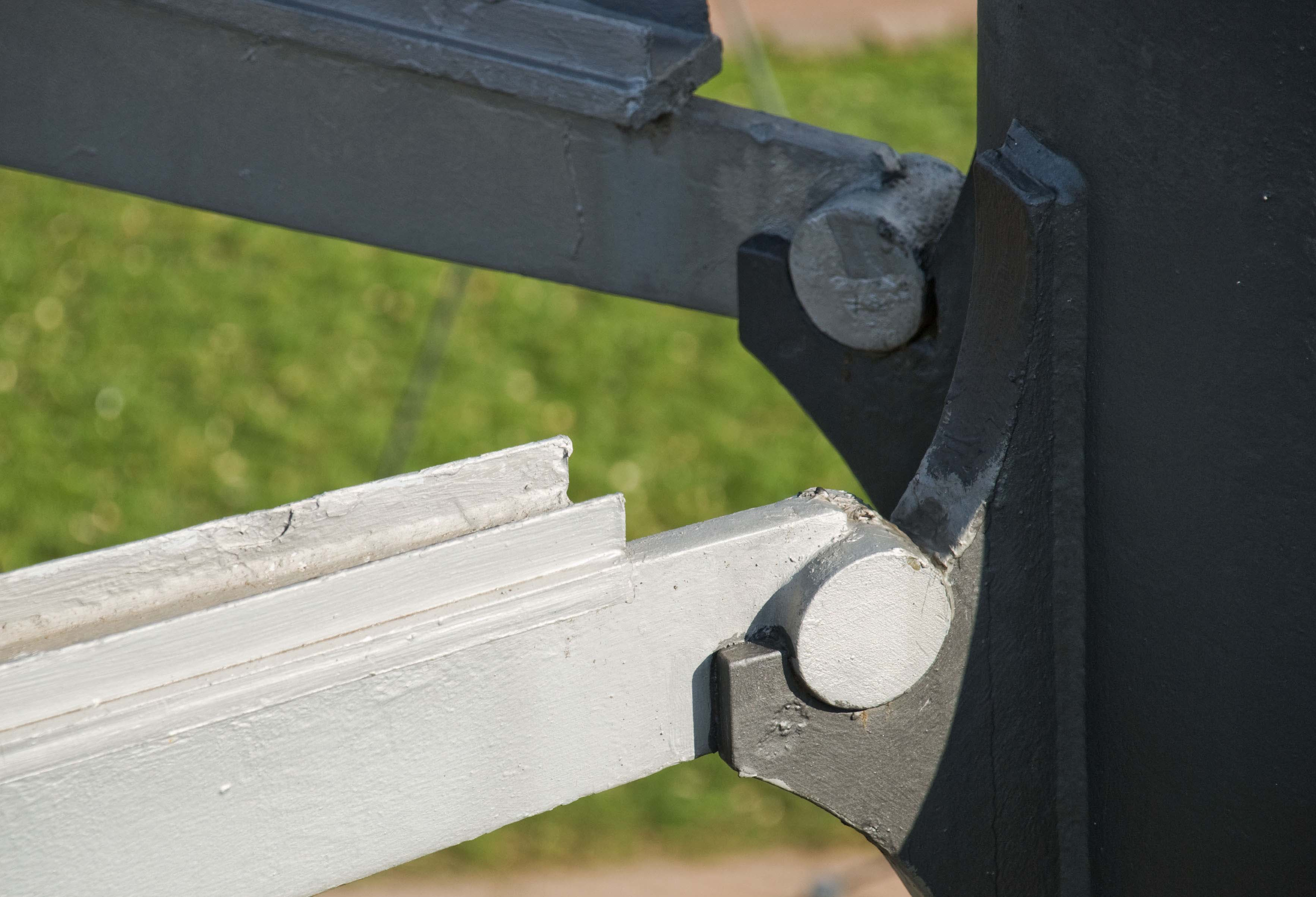
Hinge of an observation deck

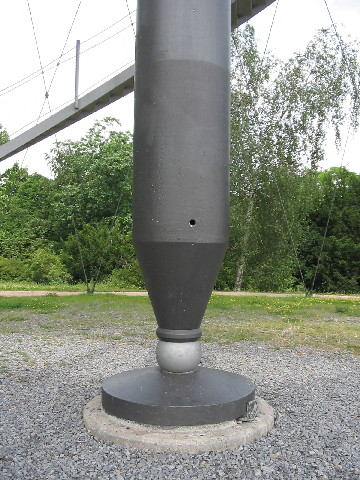
Mast heel

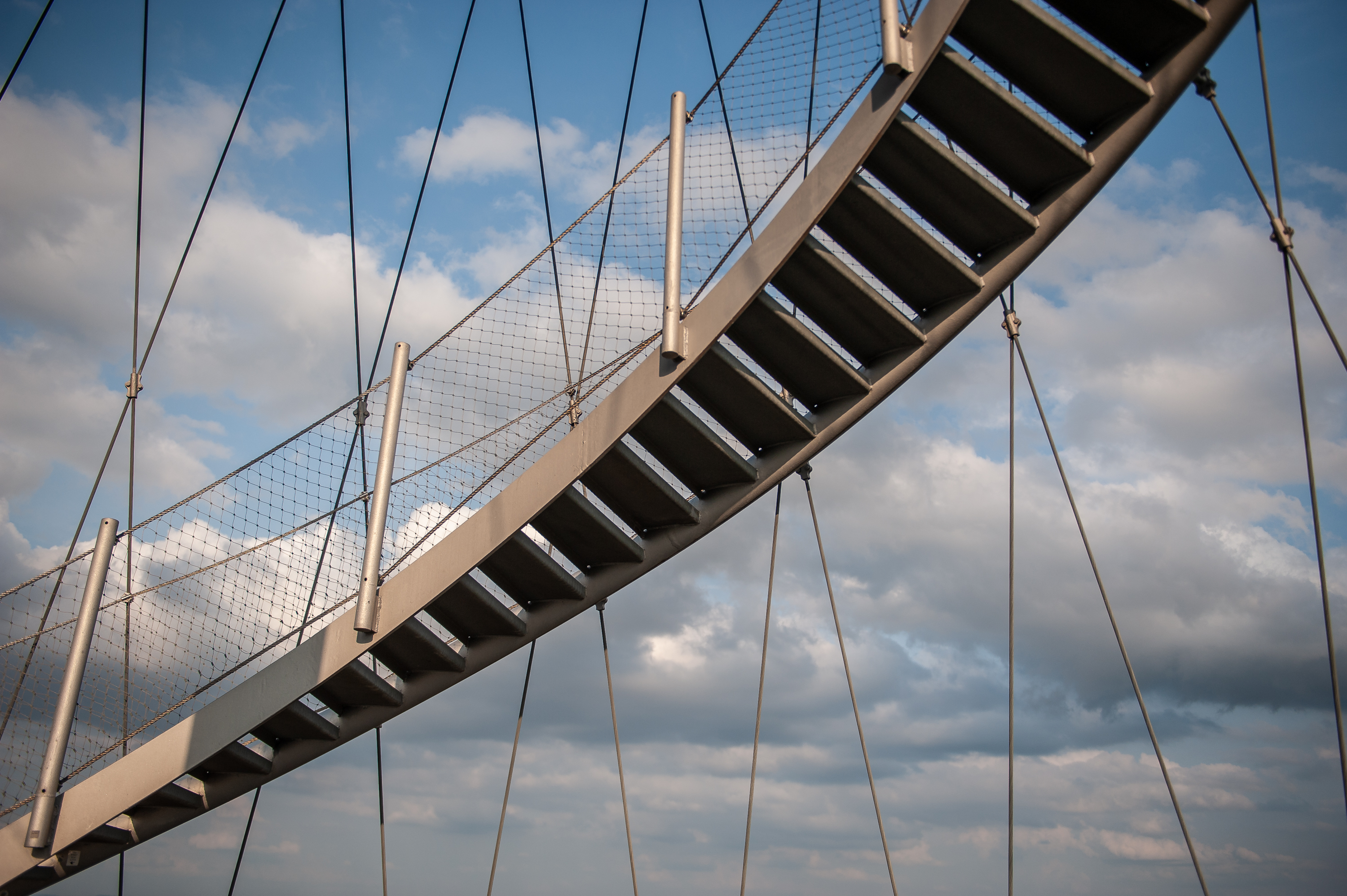
Stairs and cable net

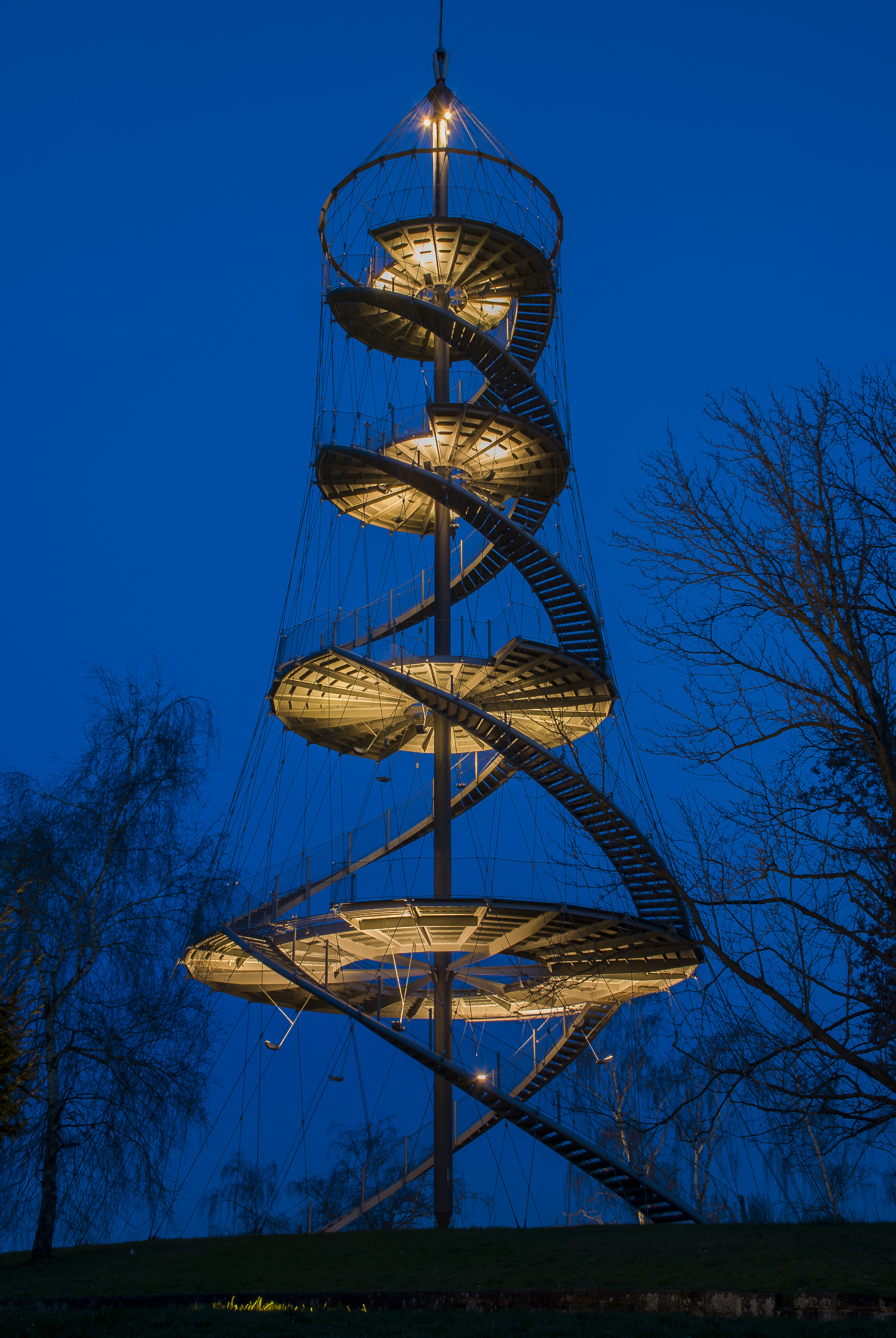
Illumination
