= Hildegard Schirmacher =

German architect (1924–2015)

- Hildegard Schirmacher, in c. 2000
- Born: 31 August 1924; Limburg, Germany
- Died: 7 March 2015 (aged 90); Limburg, Hesse, Germany
- Education: Technische Hochschule Darmstadt
- Occupations: Architect; Preservationist

Hildegard Schirmacher (born Ernst Schirmacher; 31 August 1924 – 7 March 2015) was a German architect and preservationist, performing pioneering work in historic preservation and building conservation focused on half-timbered structures, particularly in the old town of Limburg which became a model for other towns.

== Life and career ==
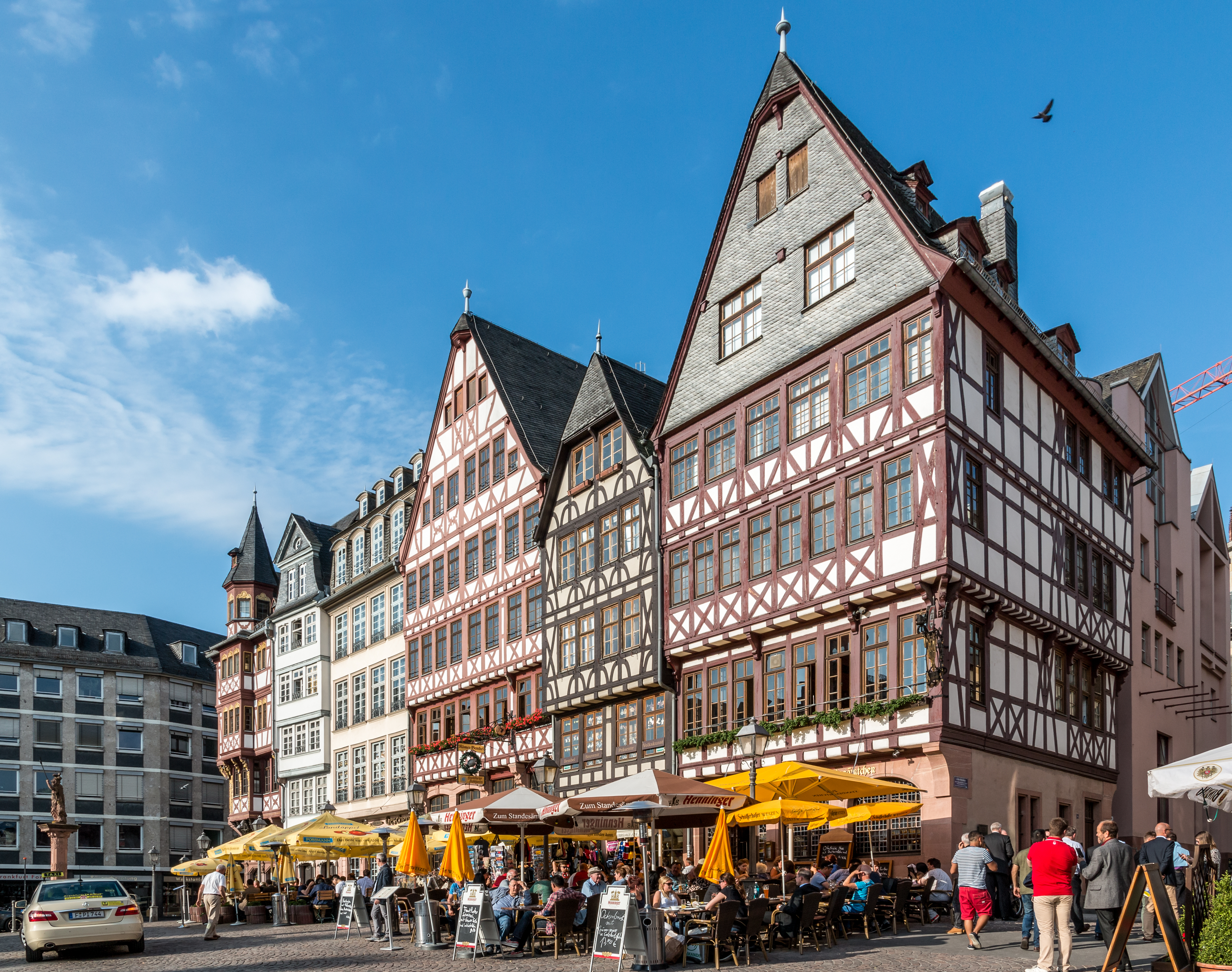
The Ostzeile of the Frankfurt Römerberg was restored with Schirmacher leading

Ernst Schirmacher was born in Limburg on 31 August 1924. After studies of architecture at the Technische Hochschule Darmstadt until 1951, the young architect worked for the Stadtbauamt of Frankfurt, for example planning the building of the Oberfinanzdirektion in the Nordend. A dissertation about the development of the medieval town of Limburg led to the achievement of a PhD in 1961. The dissertation is still regarded as a standard work on the topic. From 1963 Schirmacher worked as an independent architect; the first project was a hospital for 500 patients in Euskirchen.

In 1967 Schirmacher participated in the restoration of the old town of Bebra, and introduced a systematic catalogue of historic buildings in the old town of Limburg, which became the basis for the restoration there. In 1968 Schirmacher was appointed the leading architect of the restoration of Limburg. The restoration of the old town, performed together with Franz Josef Hamm and Walter Neuhäusser, became a model for such projects in Germany for decades. Restoration sites were also in Hachenburg, Montabaur , Camberg, Idstein, Bad Homburg and Aschaffenburg.

In 1973 Schirmacher bought the building of the former Scholastei (scholastic school) at the Limburg Cathedral to be used as a family home and architect's firm, restoring the house over the following years. Schirmacher was also active in debates around town development and monument conservation in Limburg, she co-founded of the Förderverein Limburger Schloss association, and was president and long-time member of the town's Denkmalbeirat.

Schirmacher led the restoration of the Ostzeile of the Frankfurt Römerberg from 1981 to 1983, after designs by the Berlin firm BJSS. The facades of seven houses, at the prominent location opposite the town hall and destroyed by bombing in 1944, were restored, six of them by Schirmacher's firm.

=== Personal life ===
Schirmacher was married to Charlotte Gräf from 1952; the couple lived in the former Scholastei and had a son, Matthias. Charlotte Graf died in 1987.

At age 73, Schirmacher adopted the given name Hildegard, in reference to Hildegard of Bingen, and lived as a woman. In 2012, she fell at the Cathedral stairs which led to head injuries. She moved to a nursing home. Her son and his family moved into her residence.

Schirmacher died in Limburg on 7 March 2015 She left a collection of photographs, designs and manuscripts, documenting the history of buildings in Limburg, to the Stadtarchive Limburg. In 2019 the city of Limburg decided to name a square after her. The ceremony took place on the fifth anniversary of her death.

== Publications ==
- Limburg an der Lahn: Entstehung und Entwicklung der mittelalterlichen Stadt. In: Veröffentlichungen der Historischen Kommission für Nassau. vol. 16. Wiesbaden 1963.
- Erhaltung im Städtebau: Grundlagen, Bereiche, gestaltbezogene Ortstypologie. In: Schriftenreihe des Bundesministers für Raumordnung, Bauwesen und Städtebau. vol 2: Stadtentwicklung. Bonn-Bad Godesberg 1972.
- Altstadtsanierung: Zum Beispiel Limburg an der Lahn. In: Die alte Stadt 8, 1981, ISSN 0170-9364, pp. 190–211
- Stadtvorstellungen: die Gestalt der mittelalterlichen Städte. Erhaltung und planendes Handeln. Artemis, Zürich 1988.
- Die Innenrestaurierung des Frankfurter St. Bartholomäus-Domes: Studien und Programme. Magistrat der Stadt Frankfurt am Main, Dezernat Bau, Hochbauamt, 1989.
- Die Lintburk 910: Eine Spurensuche. In: Limburg im Fluss der Zeit: Schlaglichter aus 1100 Jahren Stadtgeschichte (= Beiträge zur Geschichte der Kreisstadt Limburg an der Lahn. vol 1). Limburg an der Lahn 2010, pp. 35–62.

== Awards ==
- 1978: Goldplakette in the national competition Stadtgestalt und Denkmalschutz
- Prix Europeen de la Reconstruction de la Ville, for the restoration of six timber-frame buildings at the Frankfurt Römerberg
- 2004 Ehrenplakette from Limburg
