= Franz Josef Hamm =

German architect (born 1936)

- Born: 2 May 1936 (age 89); Limburg, Germany
- Education: Staatsbauschule Idstein
- Occupations: Architect; Preservationist
- Organizations: Association of German Architects; Deutscher Werkbund
- Awards: Villa Massimo

Franz Josef Hamm (born 2 May 1936) is a German architect. After designing buildings influenced by Le Corbusier, his work shifted to focus on historic preservation and building conservation—particularly of half-timbered structures. His pioneering work, together with Hildegard Schirmacher and Walter Neuhäusser, for the old town of Limburg became a model for other towns, including the New Frankfurt Old Town. Hamm is an art collector and patron of the arts who curated exhibitions of early modern art.

== Life and career ==
Hamm was born in Limburg on 2 May 1936 to Anna Maria and Adam Hamm, a railroad employee. After completing an apprenticeship in construction from 1952 to 1955 and an internship on a construction site with a contractor, Hamm studied architecture at the Staatsbauschule in Idstein from 1957 to 1960. He then trained at two architectural firms in Limburg and Wiesbaden 1960 to 1965, when he opened his own independent architecture firm. He worked in partnership with Walter Neuhäusser. He became an expert in historic preservation of buildings. His professional work encompassed historic preservation and building renovation, residential and social housing, museum buildings, commercial structures, landscape design, and expert reports on building maintenance and historic preservation.

Hamm became a member of the Association of German Architects in 1967, serving on the board of the Wiesbaden regional group from 1972 to 1998, and then as a member of the appeals committee. Hamm was a member of the national association, working in the Arbeitskreis Architektur und Denkmalpflege, from 1973 to 1981. In 2019, he was named an honorary member of the state association.

Hamm served in the Deutscher Werkbund on the program committee. In 1988 he organised an exhibition: Building with Nature – Green Architecture in the City. From 1994 to 2000 he was a member of the working group WuWA, working on a documentation of the 1929 housing exhibition in Breslau; in 1999 he worked on an exhibition of the work of Helmut Hofmann who had contributed to the WuWA estate, with a catalogue that Hamm co-authored. He organised an excursion of the Wiesbaden group to the exhibition. Hamm was a member of the assembly of representatives of the Architektenkammer Hessen from 1980 to 2004. Hamm held teaching positions at the University of Kassel and the University of Applied Sciences in Koblenz, as well as at the Propstei Johannesberg, a seminary for architects in historic preservation seminary in Fulda. Hamm is the author of numerous publications on the topics of housing research, building preservation, and historic preservation, as well as on 20th-century architectural and art history.

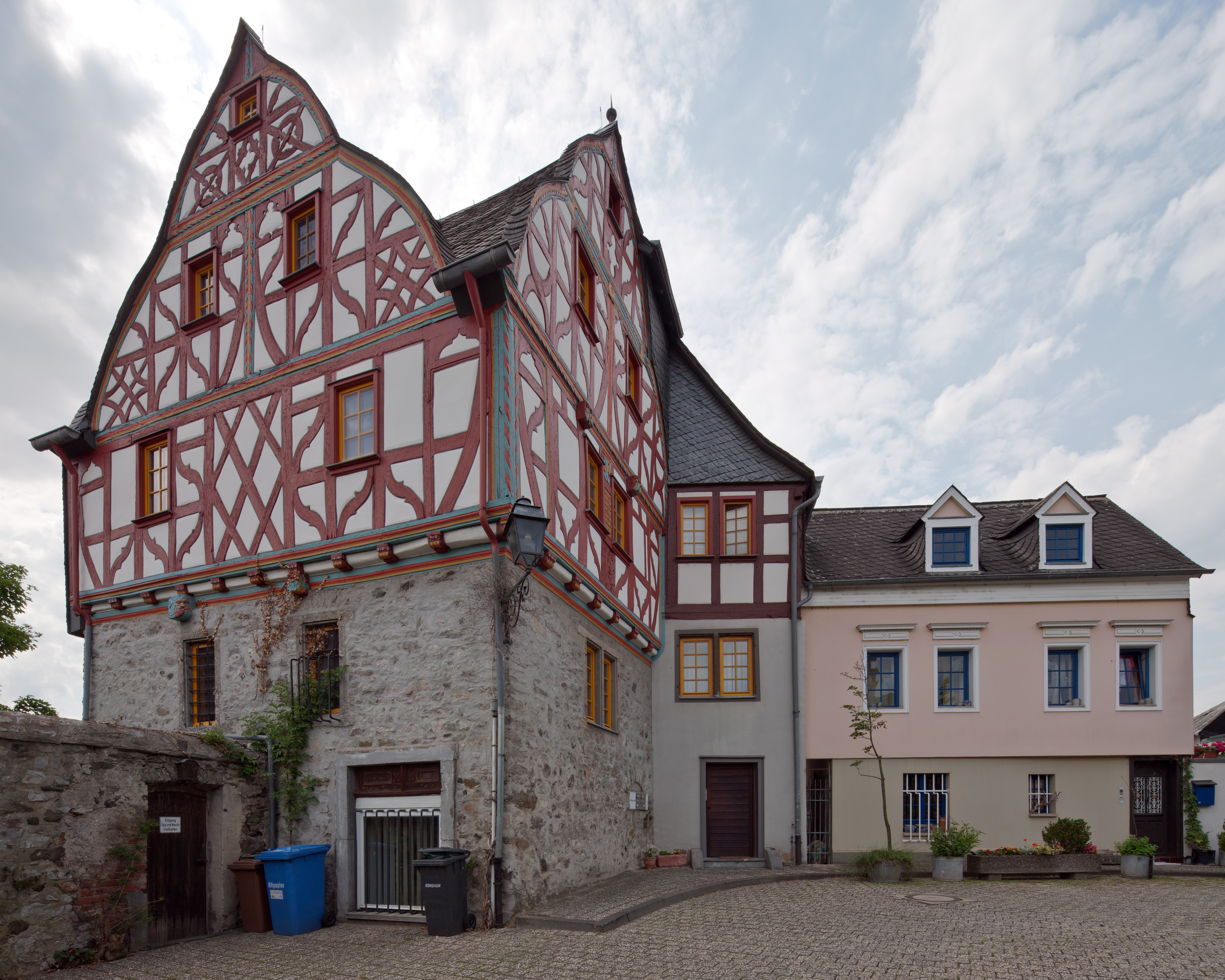
Building at Nonnenmauer 7, Limburg

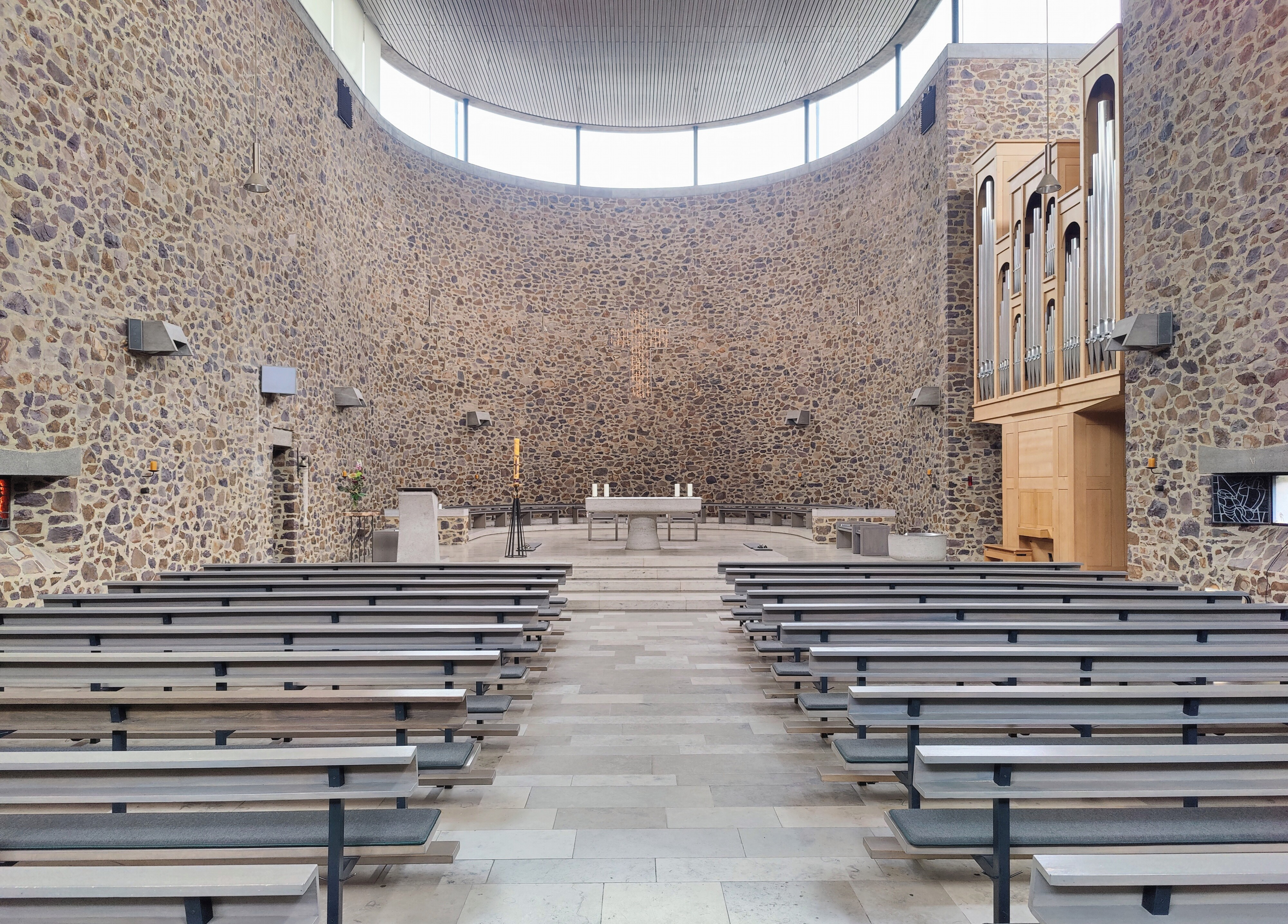
St. Martin, Idstein, reconstructed in 2003

Hamm is regarded as a pioneer in old town revitalization, particularly in the field of half-timbered house reconstruction. In collaboration with Hildegard Schirmacher and Neuhäusser he renovated Limburg's old town professionally, serving as a model for other projects such as the revitalization of Marburg's old town. Based on an architectural partnership with Jörg Torsten Brod, Hamm ran an architectural firm from 2005 to 2015 that was responsible, among other things, for the renovation of half-timbered houses in the New Frankfurt Old Town.

Hamm was awarded a Villa Massimo scholarship in 1970. Since 1976, he has received numerous awards from the Hessian Heritage Association and from cities, municipalities, and counties.

The preservation and safeguarding of the historic fabric involve the removal of later (structural) alterations in order to reveal the original character. With the exception of modern safety measures, traditional craftsmanship techniques and materials are used. Hamm places great importance on the functionality of the buildings, but also on the reversibility of modern interventions and additions.

=== Other interests ===
Beyond his professional work, Hamm is actively involved in his hometown Limburg; from 1975 to 1987, he chaired a citizens' initiative for historic preservation in Limburg, served for many years on the board of the Förderkreis Bildende Kunst (Association for the Promotion of the Visual Arts), and has been a member of the board of trustees of the Ernst Moritz Engert Limburg Foundation since 1980. An art collector and patron of the arts, he curated numerous exhibitions of early modern art. He promoted the Kunstsammlungen der Stadt Limburg collections and museum, which began in 1978 with a collection of 450 works by the silhouette artist Ernst Moritz Engert who was motivated by Hamm to transfer his works to the collection. In 2011 Hamm donated his collection of works by Willy Bungarten to the collections, which includes 181 works. In 2014 he curated an exhibition of graphic art: artists' flyers related to World War I.

== Work ==
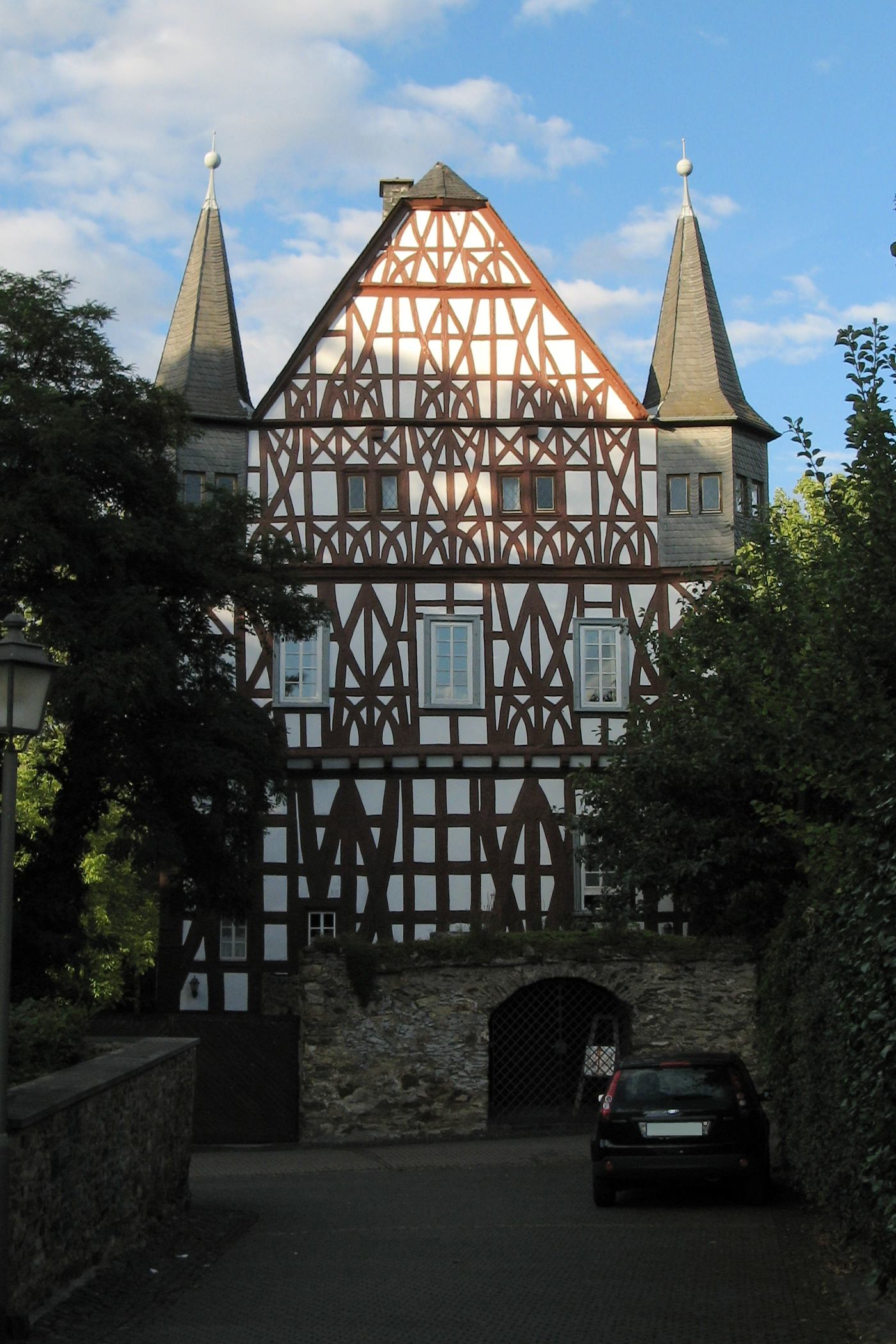
Steinscher Hof in Kirberg, 1983

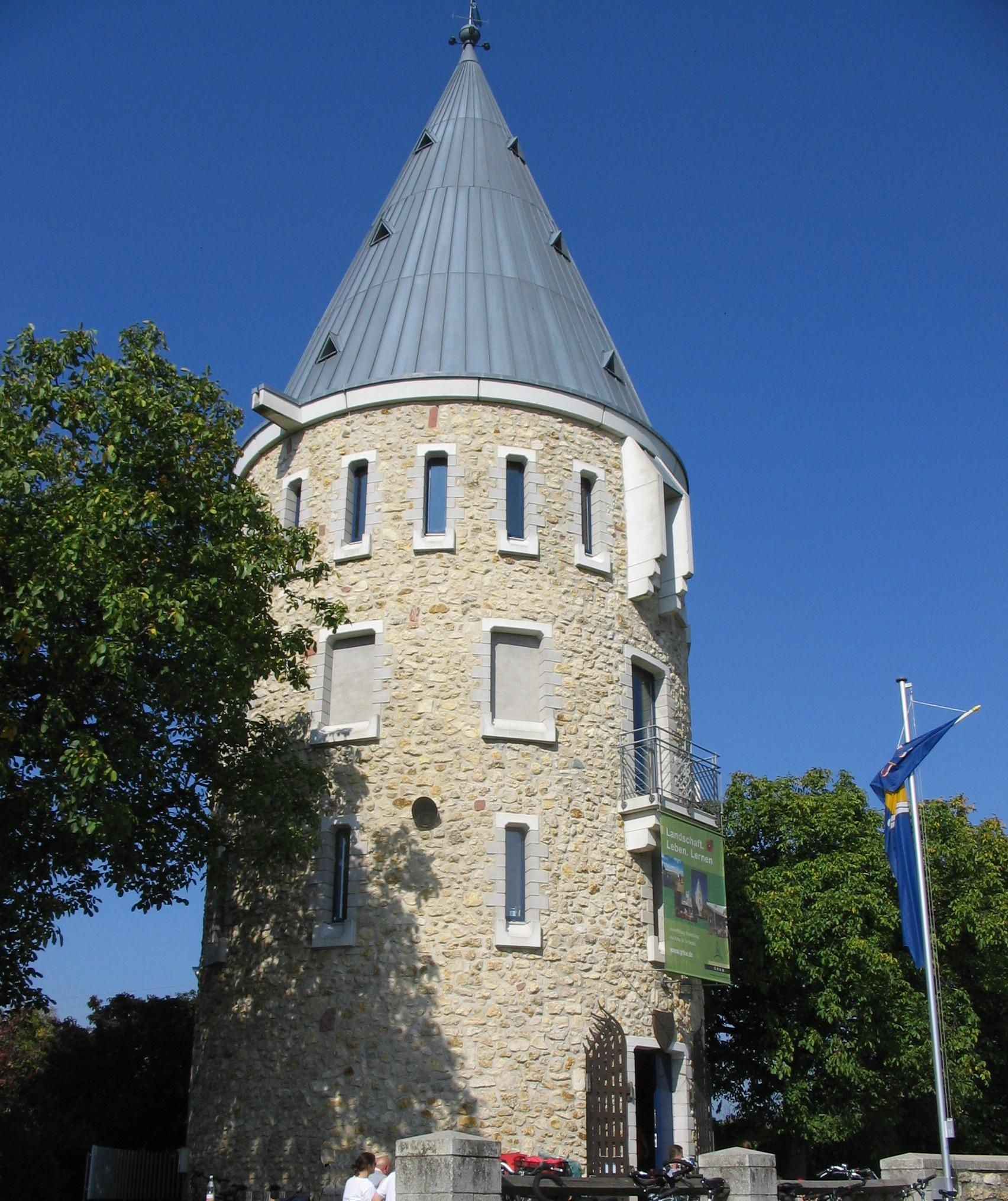
Flörsheimer Warte, reconstructed in 1996

Hamm's works, mostly preservation of historic buildings, include:

- 1969–1972: Limburg, Nonnenmauer 7, 1977, restoration of facade 2004
- 1972–1973: Chapel on the Limburg main cemetery, new building
- 1973–1974: Limburg, Fischmarkt 16/17
- 1975–1976: Limburg, Barfüßerstraße 6
- 1976–1977: Limburg, Die kleine Domtreppe 7
- 1976–1977: Limburg, Römer 1, also addition of a stairs tower
- 1980–1983: Kirberg, Steinscher Hof, partly reconstruction
- 1979–1984: Mainz, Leininger Hof, also new parts
- 1983–1985: Limburg, chapel of the Marienhof, also rebuilding
- 1978–1986: Dausenau, town hall, also new usage
- 1979–1991: Altes Schloss Büdesheim, also new usage
- 1983–1991: Neustadt, town hall (Schloss Dörnberg), also new usage
- 1987–1989: Limburg, Fischmarkt 8/9
- 1991–1992: Butzbach-Ostheim, Altes Rathaus, also new usage
- 1995–1997: Flörsheimer Warte, reconstruction after historic plans
- 1998–2001: Limburg, Roßmarkt 15
- 2001: Flörsheim, Mainturm and Wärmstübchen, also expansion and connection by a glass bridge
- 2002–2003: Dietenhausen, Altes Rathaus
- 2002–2004: St. Martin, Idstein, restoration and new order
- 2003–2006: Chapel of Schloss Molsberg
- 1983–2011: Schloss Langenau, restoration
- 2009–2011: Frankfurt, buildings in New Frankfurt Old Town
- 1984–2014: Steinsches Schloss, restoration
- 1987–2014: Lahneck Castle, restoration

== Publications ==
- 1920/21 – ein Künstlerpaar in Assisi. Josef Eberz (1880–1942) + Gertrud Eberz-Alber (1879–1955). catalogue of 2020 exhibition at Kunstsammlungen der Stadt Limburg, 2020, ISBN 978-3-936162-14-1.
- with Reusch, Felicita: Ein Künstlerpaar zwischen den Weltkriegen. Der Bildhauer Arnold Hensler und die Fotografin Annie Hensler-Möring. Reichert, Wiesbaden 2018, ISBN 978-3-95-490312-2.
- Martin Weber und Arnold Hensler. Eine Künstlerpartnerschaft. In: Das Münster. 2011, No. 1, pp. 10–19.
- Ungewohnte Blicke auf die Limburger Altstadt. Magistrat, Limburg, 2010, ISBN 978-3 93-616207-3.
- Über das Rekonstruieren von Fachwerkhäusern. In: Ursula Wenzel (ed.): Standpunkte zur Bebauung des Frankfurter Römerbergs. Deutscher Werkbund Hessen, Frankfurt am Main 2007, pp. 49–51.
- Josef Eberz. Bau- und raumbezogene Arbeiten, Wandmalereien, Mosaiken, Fenster, Altarbilder. catalogue of 1997 exhibition at Kunstsammlungen der Stadt Limburg, Förderkreis der Freunde der bildenden Kunst & Magistrat, Limburg, 1997, ISBN 3-9802789-5-6.
- Im Gegenlicht – ein Schattenbild. Engert zum 100. Geburtstag. 1992 exhibition at Kunstsammlungen der Stadt Limburg and Ernst-Moritz-Engert-Museum in Stadtmuseum Hadamar, Limburg, 1992, ISBN 3-9802789-1-3.
- "Kragwölbung und Kragkuppel. Konstruktion, Formgebung und Verbreitung neuzeitlicher Bauten in vorzeitlicher Technik", Bonner Jahrbücher, vol. 174, pp. 299–335, 1974, doi:10.11588/bjb.1974.1.83667

== Awards ==
- 1970: Villa Massimo
- 1982: Staatspreis für Architektur und Städtebau from Rhineland-Palatinate
- 1998: Denkmalschutzpreis from the Wetteraukreis for the town hall in Butzbach-Ostheim
- 2010: Bundesdenkmalschutzpreis for the preservation of the Schlosskapelle Molsberg
- 2015: Ehrenplakette from the city of Limburg
