= Killesbergpark =

Public park in Stuttgart, Germany

Coordinates: 48°48′26″N 9°10′19″E

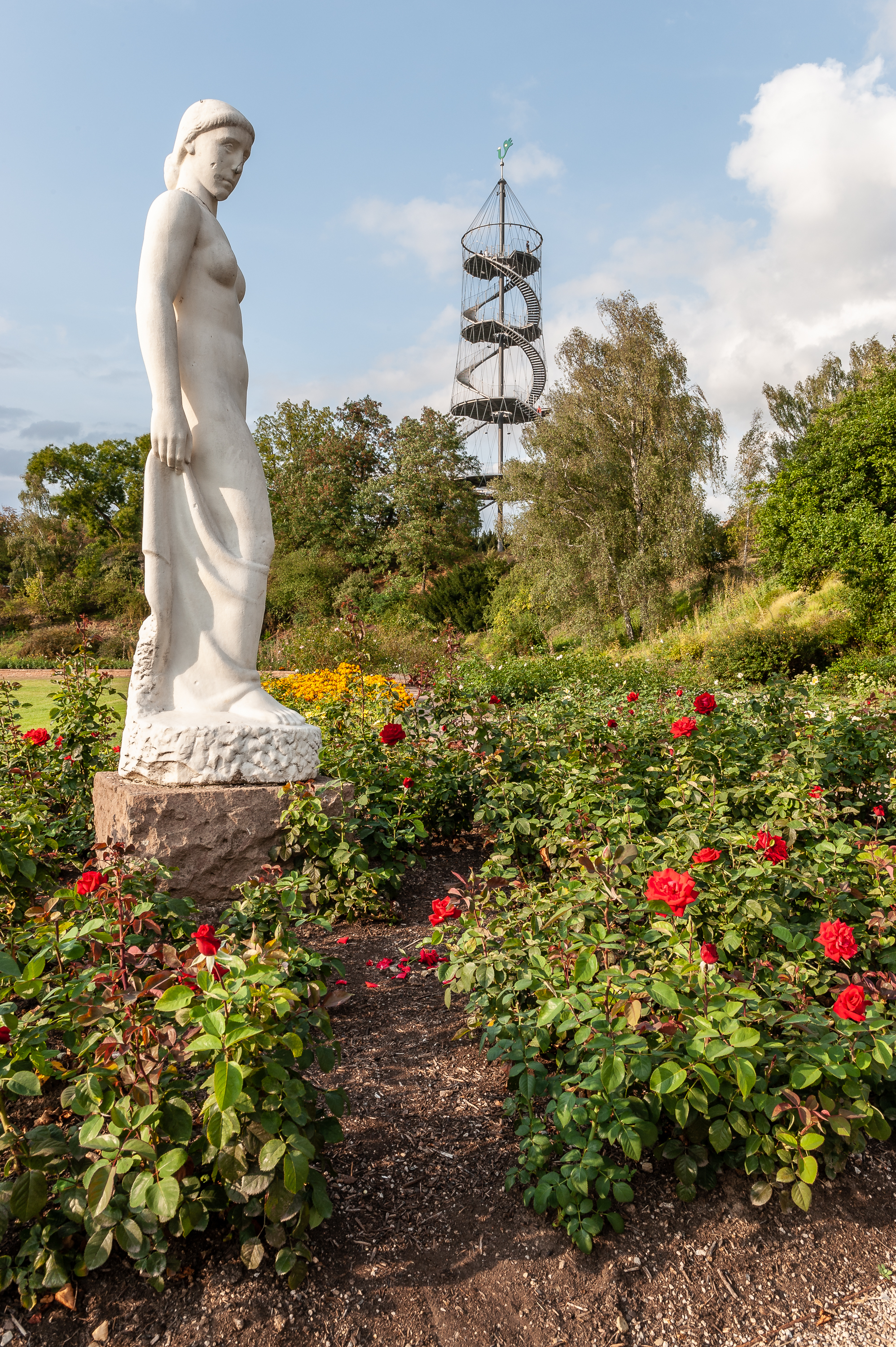
Valley of Roses and Killesberg Tower

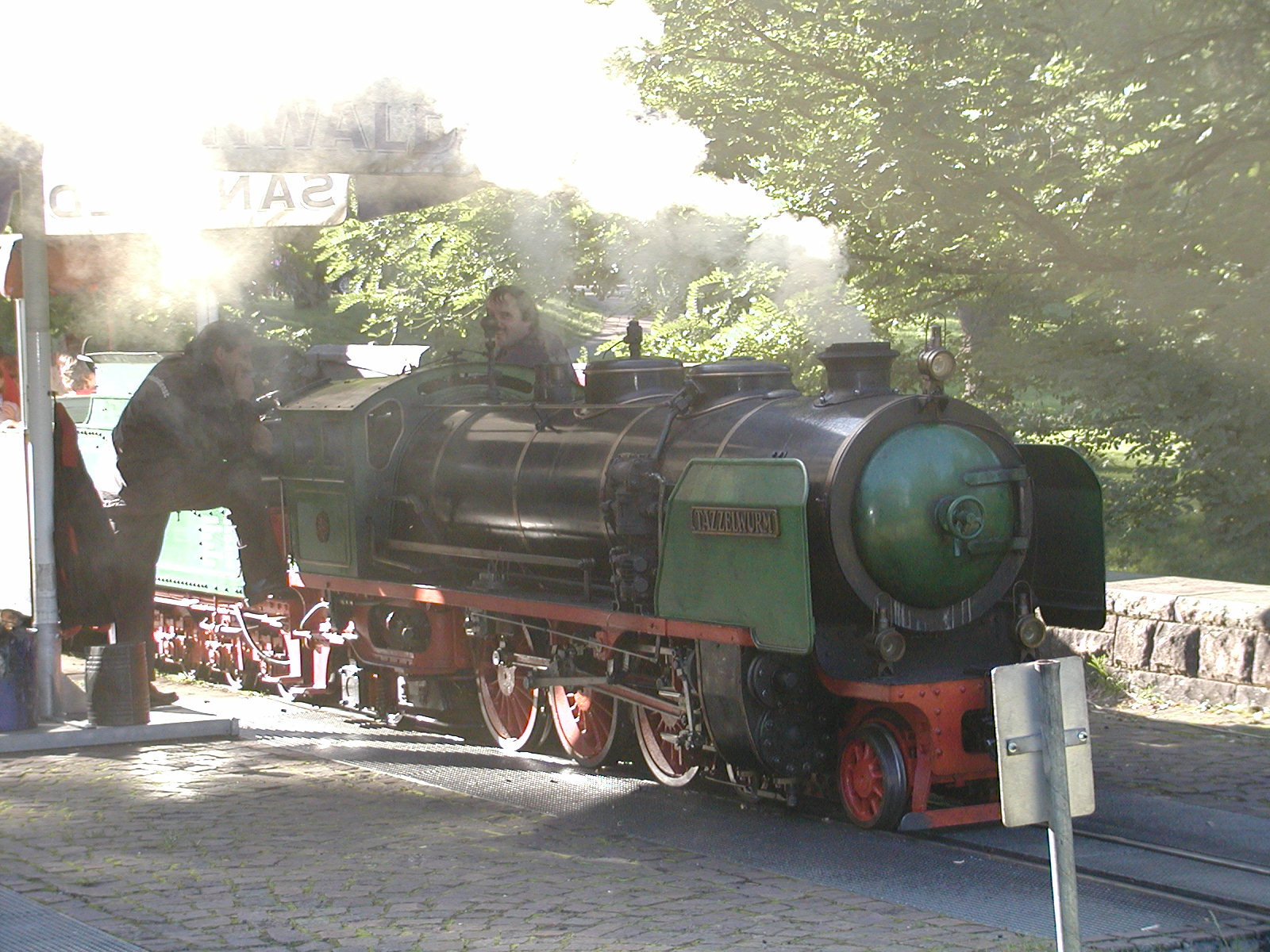
Killesberg railway

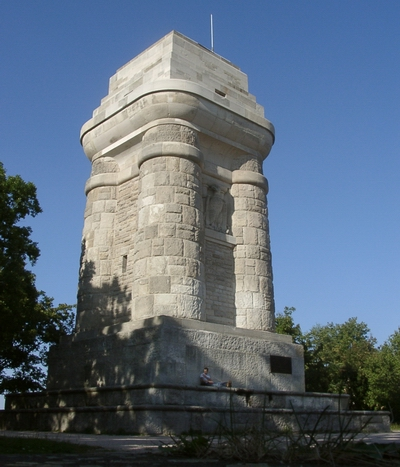
Bismarck Tower

The Killesbergpark (Höhenpark Killesberg) is an urban public park of half a square kilometre (123 acres) in Stuttgart, Germany. It is just north of the state capital, where Killesberg is a quarter of the borough of Stuttgart-Nord (North).

The park dates back to the horticultural show of 1939. Before the show, a large area of the park had been a quarry. It was transformed into a park with exhibition sites for the show, and has remained, hosting horticultural events on a regular basis, including the “Bundesgartenschau” and the IGA (Internationale Gartenbauausstellung), both garden festivals.

The Killesbergpark bordered for many years the city's fairgrounds. In 2007, Messe Stuttgart moved to new ground close to Stuttgart Airport.

Every July the park hosts the popular Lichterfest Stuttgart. Thousands of lanterns are placed around the park, decorating the park for a variety of family activities throughout. After dark, there is a fireworks show accompanied by music. Visitors often bring blankets to sit on for the show.

== Killesberg railway ==
Since its opening, the park has been home to the 381-millimetre (15-inch) narrow-gauge Killesberg railway. In the summer months, visitors can see two diesel and two steam locomotives, which have been fixtures in the park since 1950. The horticultural show of 1939 saw the opening of the railway, when two borrowed steam engines from Leipzig traversed a short stretch of track. During World War II, the steam engines were returned to Leipzig for use there. New locomotives were purchased, and today there are two diesel and three steam engines in use.

== Killesberg tower ==
Completed in 2001 the Killesberg Tower is a 40m high observation tower, overlooking the park. It was designed by Jörg Schlaich, using cable-stayed bridge technology.

== Other features ==
From the 1950s until the 1980s there was a chair lift for visitors to enjoy views of the fairgrounds and parklands.

The twenty-metre high Bismarck tower stands one kilometre south-west of the exhibition halls. It was built on the Gaehkopf, the highest point in northern Stuttgart, giving good views of Stuttgart itself and in all directions. It was one of many towers built to commemorate Otto von Bismarck. The building of over 410 Bismarck towers worldwide was planned, and 238 were actually built. The building of the tower was begun in 1902 by the students at the technical university in Stuttgart. The Stuttgart Bismarck tower was opened on 16 July 1904. In 2004, for its 100th anniversary, it was comprehensively renovated.

== Surroundings ==
- Near the Bismarck tower is the Theodor Heuss house, the house of the first German Federal President, which has been converted into a museum.
- An open-air swimming pool borders the fairground buildings to the north.
- To the southwest lies the Weissenhof Settlement of 1927, a protected monument, exhibiting "the dwelling" as initiated by the German work federation.
- The American scholar and writer Richard J. Powers lives in the area.

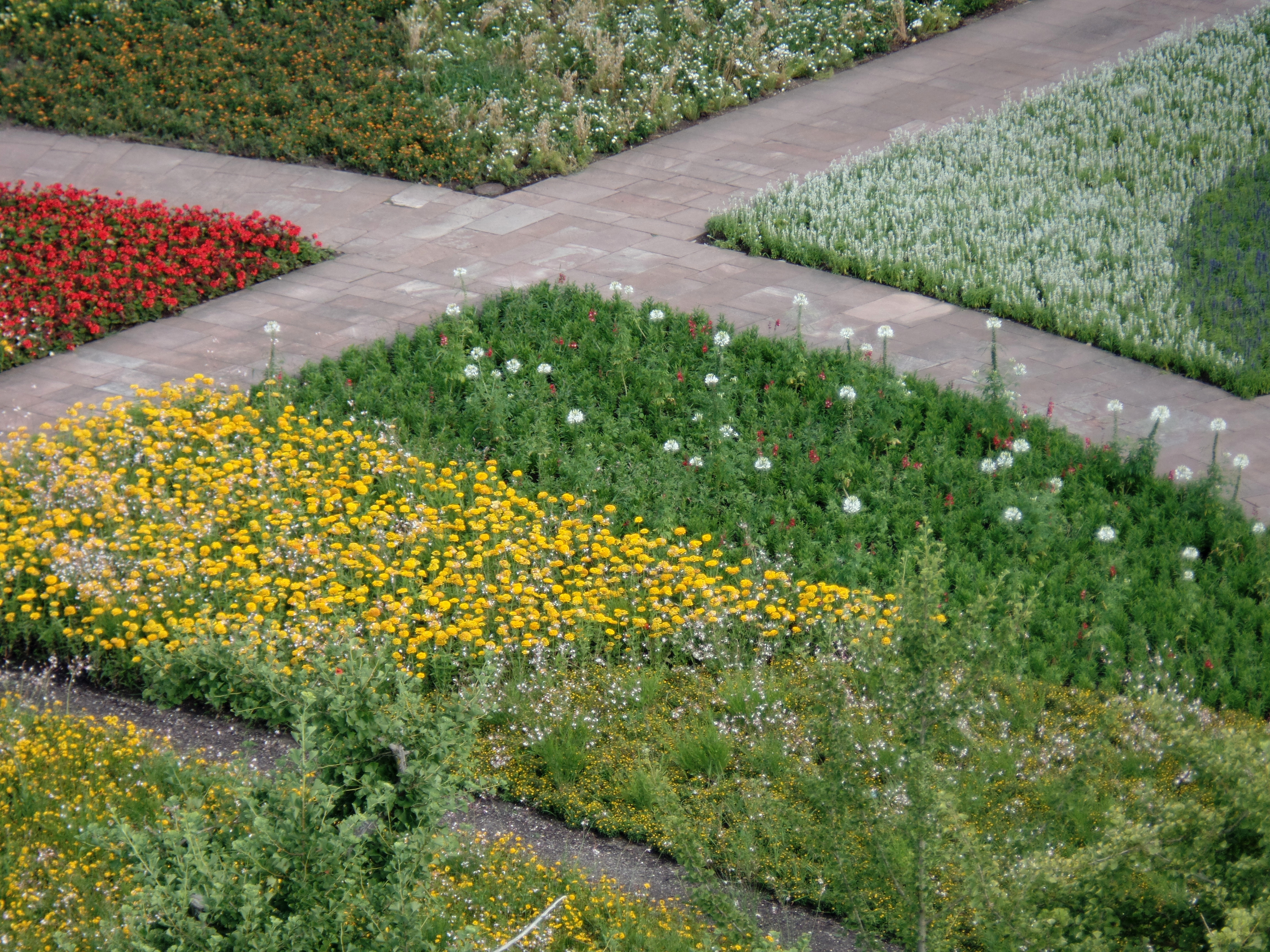
Flower beds at Höhenpark Killesberg
