= Killesberg Railway =

Miniature railway in Stuttgart, Germany

Coordinates: 48°48′22″N 9°10′00″E

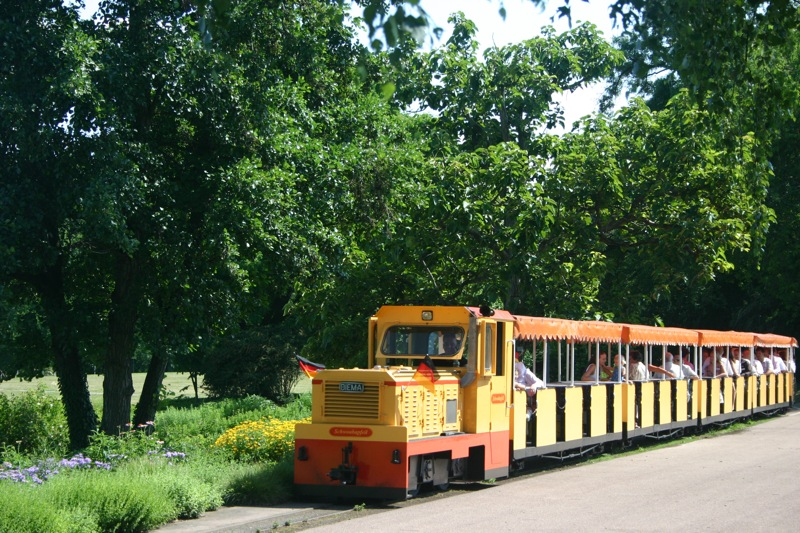
Killesberg Railway diesel locomotive and train

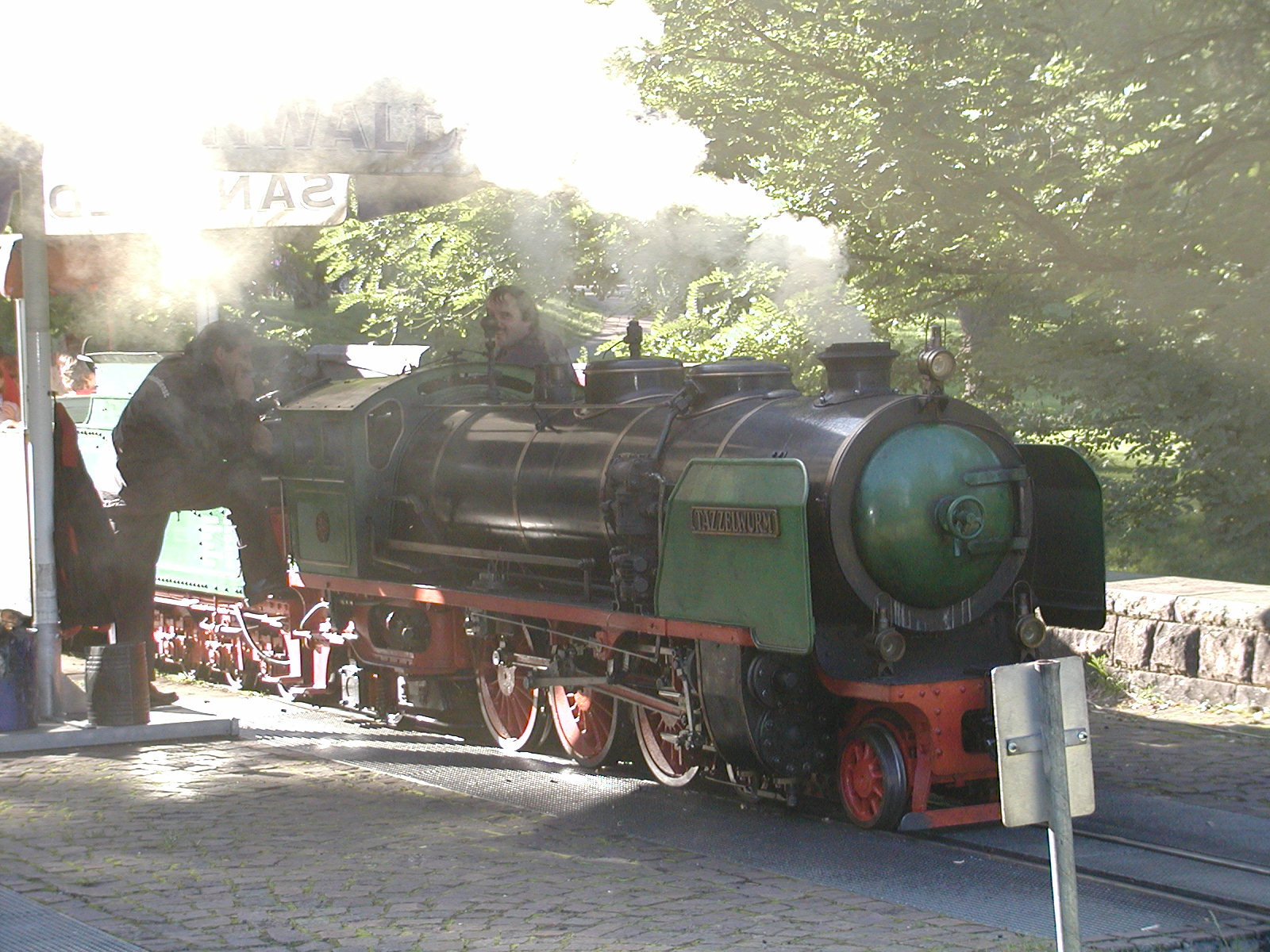
Killesberg Railway steam locomotive

The Killesberg Railway (German: Killesbergbahn) is a miniature railway in the Killesberg Park in Stuttgart, Germany. It is the oldest of the three remaining miniature railways in Germany.

The railway opened with the park, as a part of the 1939 garden show in Stuttgart. The 15 in (381 mm) gauge track travels in a 2,294.35-metre (7,527.4-foot) loop around the park. Diesel locomotives pull trains around the park daily during the summer months whilst steam locomotives are used for weekends and special occasions.

The park now maintains three steam engines: Tazzelwurm and Springerle which were manufactured and delivered in 1950; the steam locomotive Santa Maria, a 1929 locomotive which was purchased in 2014, and two diesel engines: Blitzschwoab, the oldest of the two diesel engines, manufactured in 1950, and Schwoabapfeil, which was manufactured in 1992. The steam engines that originally operated on the line until they were removed to Leipzig during World War II.

The Killesbergbahn was formerly operated by the Stuttgart Fair company and since 2011, the railway has been operated by Stuttgarter Straßenbahnen. The railway operates from Easter until early November. On 2 April 2024, all of the passenger cars derailed due to rocks on the rail, but the steam locomotive remained on the track. The passengers had to return to the station by foot. The rail cars were not damaged in the accident.

== See also ==
- Fifteen-inch gauge railway
