= Fritz Leonhardt =

German engineer (1909–1999)

- Born: 12 July 1909; Stuttgart, Germany
- Died: 30 December 1999 (aged 90)
- Education: Stuttgart University; Purdue University.
- Engineering career
- Discipline: Structural engineer
- Institutions: Institution of Structural Engineers
- Practice name: Leonhardt und Andrä
- Projects: Cologne-Rodenkirchen Bridge; Stuttgart Television Tower
- Awards: Werner von Siemens Ring; Honorary Medal Emil Mörsch; Freyssinet Medal of the FIP; IStructE Gold Medal; Award of Merit in Structural Engineering

Fritz Leonhardt (12 July 1909 – 30 December 1999) was a German structural engineer who made major contributions to 20th-century bridge engineering, especially in the development of cable-stayed bridges. His book Bridges: Aesthetics and Design is well known throughout the bridge engineering community.

== Biography ==
Born in Stuttgart in 1909, Leonhardt studied at Stuttgart University and Purdue University. In 1934 he joined the German Highway Administration, working with Paul Bonatz amongst others. He was appointed at the remarkably young age of 28 as the Chief Engineer for the Cologne-Rodenkirchen Bridge.

In 1954 he formed the consulting firm Leonhardt und Andrä, and from 1958 to 1974 taught the design of reinforced concrete and prestressed concrete at Stuttgart University. He was President of the University from 1967 to 1969.

He received Honorary Doctorates from six universities, honorary membership of several important engineering universities, and won a number of prizes including the Werner von Siemens Ring, the Honorary Medal Emil Mörsch, the Freyssinet Medal of the FIP, and the Gold Medal of the Institution of Structural Engineers. In 1988, he was awarded an Honorary Degree (Doctor of Science) by the University of Bath.

Throughout his career, Leonhardt was as dedicated to research as to design, and his major contributions to bridge engineering technology included:

- development of a launching system for prestressed concrete bridges, first used in his 1963 bridge over the Caroní River in Ciudad Guayana, Venezuela
- the 'Hi-Am' anchor for cable stays, in collaboration with the Swiss firm B.B.R.V.
- anchorages in prestressed concrete
- experiments during the 1930s on steel orthotropic decks.

== Major works ==
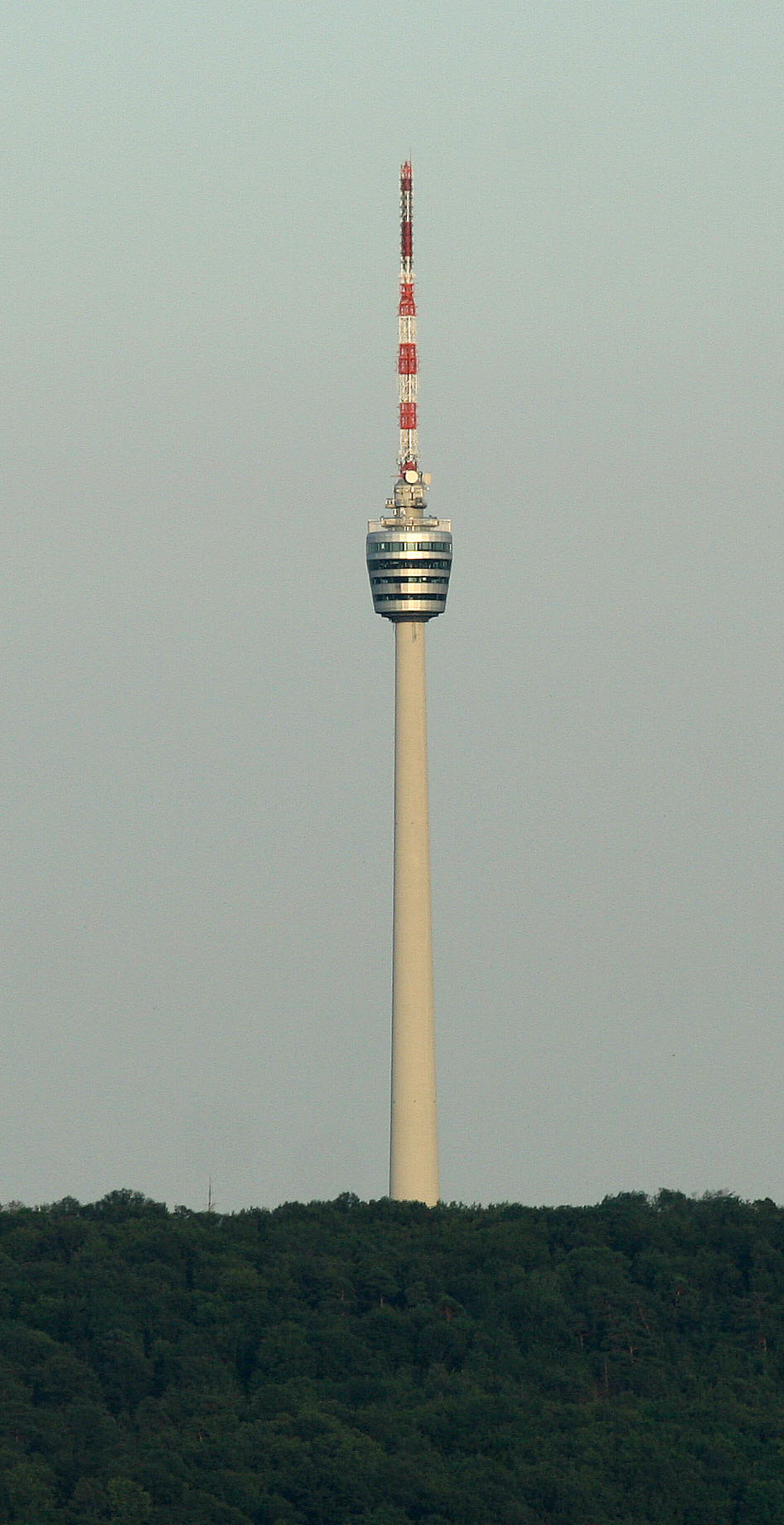
First modern TV Tower in Stuttgart

His major structures include the Cologne-Rodenkirchen Bridge, Stuttgart Television Tower, Hamburg's Alsterschwimmhalle and various cable-stayed bridges in Düsseldorf.

He also worked on the design of several cable-stayed bridges abroad, including the Pasco-Kennewick bridge (1978) in the U.S., and the Helgeland Bridge (1981) in Norway.

== Fritz Leonhardt Prize ==
This prize was established in 1999 on the 90th anniversary of Leonhardt's birth, to recognise outstanding achievements in structural engineering. The first prize was awarded to Michel Virlogeux. Subsequent winners have included Jörg Schlaich (2002), René Walter (2005), and William F. Baker (engineer) (2009).

== Bibliography ==
- Brücken / Bridges (4th edition), Deutsche Verlags-Anstalt, Stuttgart (Germany), ISBN 3-421-02590-8, 1994 (first published 1982).
- Ponts/Puentes, Presses polytechniques et universitaires romandes, Lausanne (Switzerland), ISBN 2-88074-099-1, 1986.
