= Römer 2-4-6 =

Gothic timbered house in Hesse, Germany

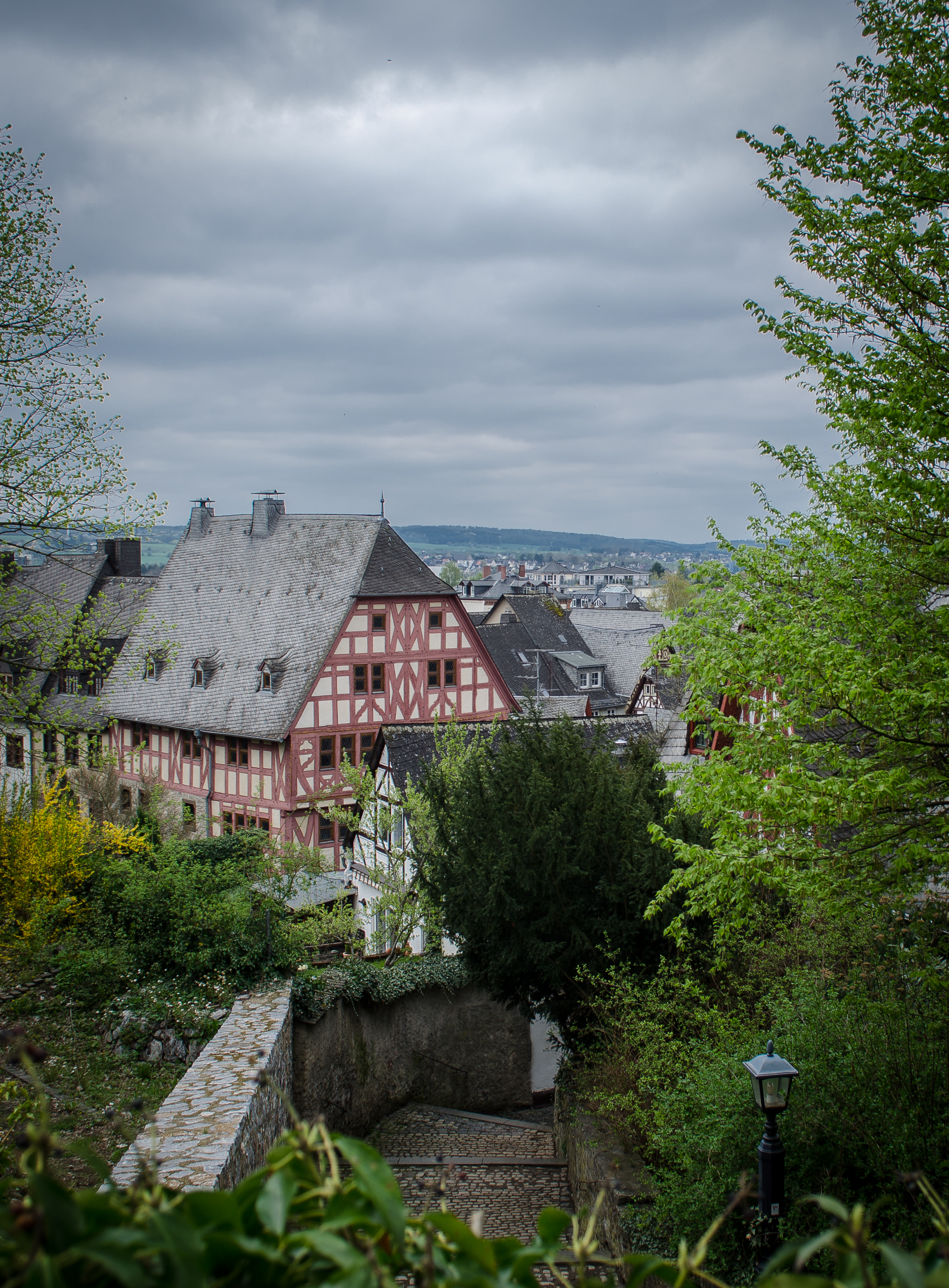

- Location in Germany

General information
- Type: Timbered house
- Architectural style: Gothic
- Location: Limburg an der Lahn, Hesse, Germany, Römer 2-4-6
- Coordinates: 50°23′21″N 8°03′52″E
- Completed: 1289

Römer 2-4-6 is a Gothic timbered house constructed in 1289. It is one of the oldest timbered houses in Germany and is in the historical old German town of Limburg an der Lahn. It is considered a historical monument by the state of Hesse.

== History and architecture ==
Römer 2-4-6, constructed in 1289, is one of the oldest surviving Gothic timber-framed houses in Germany. Its architectural style is rooted in the Gothic tradition, characterized by pointed arches, steep gabled roofs, and wooden framing.

The house was built during a period of prosperity in Limburg an der Lahn, a time when timber was the primary building material due to the abundance of forests in the region.

The town of Limburg, strategically located along the Lahn River, became a key center of trade and culture in the Middle Ages, influencing the architectural choices of its buildings.

Römer 2-4-6 stands out due to its preservation, showcasing medieval building techniques that have largely remained intact over the centuries.

The building’s importance was officially recognized when it was designated as a historical monument by the state of Hesse, ensuring its continued conservation. Additionally, it serves as an example of Gothic timber-framed houses that were once common in the region, though few remain today.
