= Jörg Schlaich =

German civil engineer (1934–2021)

- Born: 17 October 1934; Stetten im Remstal, Württemberg, Germany
- Died: 4 September 2021 (aged 86)
- Education: Stuttgart University; Technische Universität Berlin; Case Western Reserve University, Cleveland, Ohio, United States
- Engineering career
- Discipline: Structural engineer
- Institutions: Institution of Structural Engineers
- Practice name: Schlaich Bergermann & Partner
- Projects: Olympic Stadium, Munich; Gottlieb-Daimler-Stadion; Solar updraft tower
- Significant advance: strut and tie model for reinforced concrete
- Awards: IStructE Gold Medal, Werner von Siemens Ring, Award of Merit in Structural Engineering, José-Entrecanales-Ibarra-award

Jörg Schlaich (17 October 1934 – 4 September 2021) was a German structural engineer and is known internationally for his ground-breaking work in the creative design of bridges, long-span roofs, and other complex structures. He was a co-founder of the structural engineering and consulting firm Schlaich Bergermann Partner.

He was the brother of the architect Brigitte Schlaich Peterhans.

== Early career ==
Jörg Schlaich studied architecture and civil engineering from 1953 to 1955 at Stuttgart University before completing his studies at Technische Universität Berlin in 1959. He spent 1959 and 1960 at the Case Western Reserve University in Cleveland, United States.

In 1963, he joined the firm Leonhardt & Andrä, the firm founded by Fritz Leonhardt.

== Later career ==
Schlaich was made a partner and was responsible for the Alsterschwimmhalle in Hamburg, and more importantly, the Olympic Stadium in Munich. He stayed with the firm until 1969.

In 1974 he became an academic at Stuttgart University, and in 1980 he founded his own firm, Schlaich Bergermann Partner.

In 1993, with the roof of the Gottlieb-Daimler-Stadion (since 2023 MHPArena) in Stuttgart, he introduced the "speichenrad" principle to structural engineering. Indeed, this principle was employed for the first time in the history of Structural Engineering by the Italian engineer Massimo Majowiecki, the designer of the roof of the Olympic Stadium, Rome (built in 1990, three years before the Gottlieb-Daimler-Stadion). Since then, his company has successfully employed it in stadium projects across the globe. Other structures include the observation tower at the Killesbergpark in Stuttgart. Most of his work as well of that of his company is documented on their website. He was also the developer of the solar tower (or solar chimney) and is largely credited with inventing the strut and tie model for reinforced concrete.
