= Alsterschwimmhalle =

Swimming venue in Hamburg, Germany

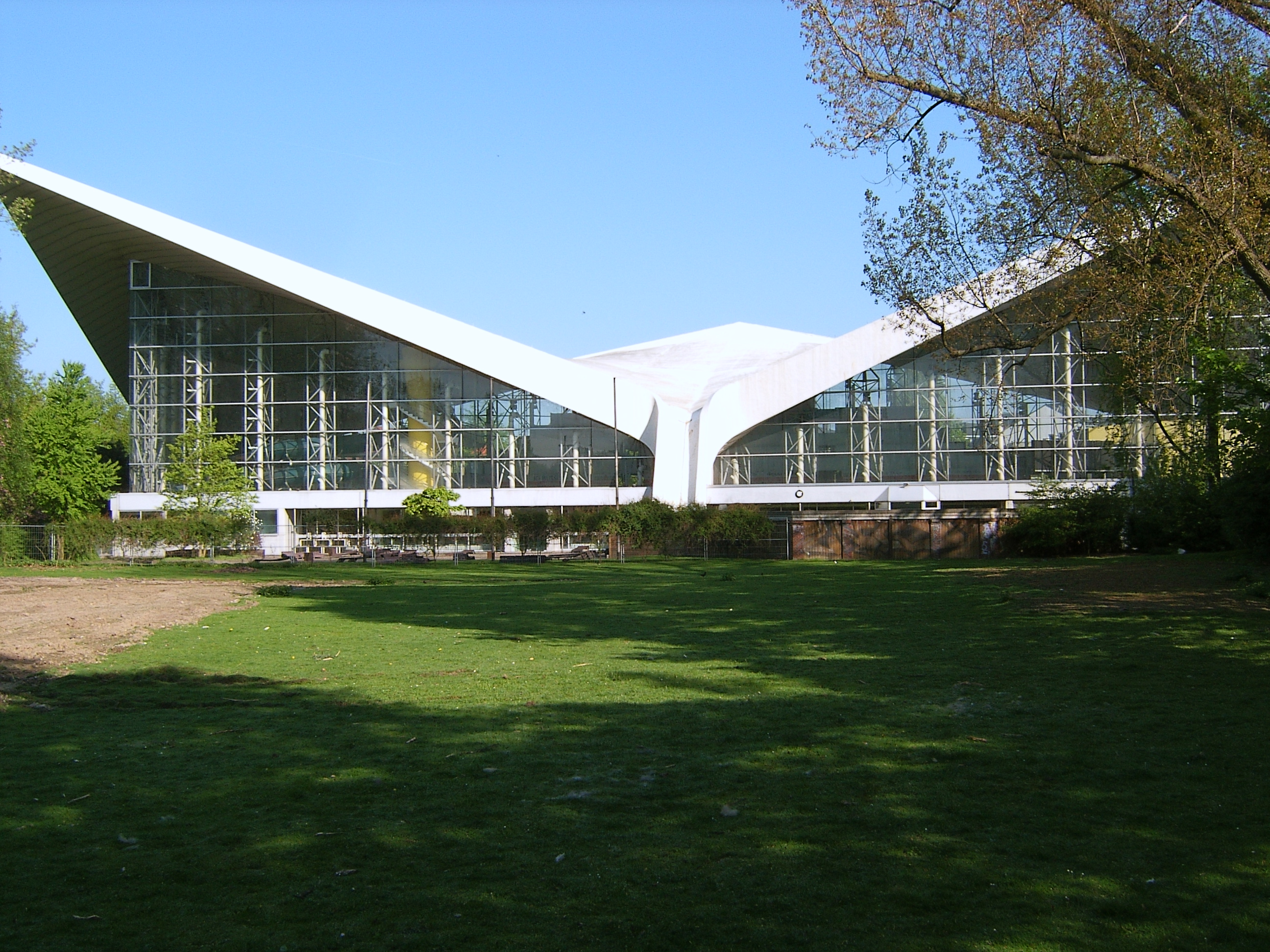
- Interactive map of Alsterschwimmhalle
- Address: Hamburg, Germany
- Coordinates: 53°33′36″N 10°01′18″E
- Pool size: Length: 50 m (160 ft); Width: 25 m (82 ft); Depth: 1.8–5.0 m (5.9–16.4 ft)

Construction
- Opened: 20 January 1973
- Cost: DM 36 million
- Architect: Niessen + Störme
- Structural engineer: Jörg Schlaich

The Alsterschwimmhalle is one of Germany's larger aquatics centers, located in the Hamburg district of Hohenfelde. Opened in 1973, it has regularly hosted various national and international swimming competitions.

The Alsterschwimmhalle was designed by the architects Horst Niessen, Rolf Störmer, and Walter Neuhäusser, and features a 102 m (335 ft) by 52 m (171 ft) double hyperbolic-paraboloid concrete-shell roof structure, designed by Jörg Schlaich, then partner at Stuttgart-based engineering firm Leonhardt & Andrä. Resting on three bearings and only 8 cm (3.1 in) thin, the concrete roof remains one the world's largest of its kind. Reminiscent of a butterfly—an allegory to its function as a swimming venue – the airy roof structure earned the Alsterschwimmhalle its nickname as "Schwimmoper" (Aquatic Opera).

The roof of the Alsterschwimmhalle is listed as a protected structure by Germany's Office for the Preservation of Historic Monuments. It has been described as "an outstanding example of Hamburg's post-war architecture" and was the subject of an extensive renovations in 2007 at a cost of approx 1 mio EUR, and refurbished again in the early 2020s at an estimated cost of 60 mio EUR. It was shortlisted for the sustainable renovation category of the 2024 Dezeen Awards.

== Facilities ==
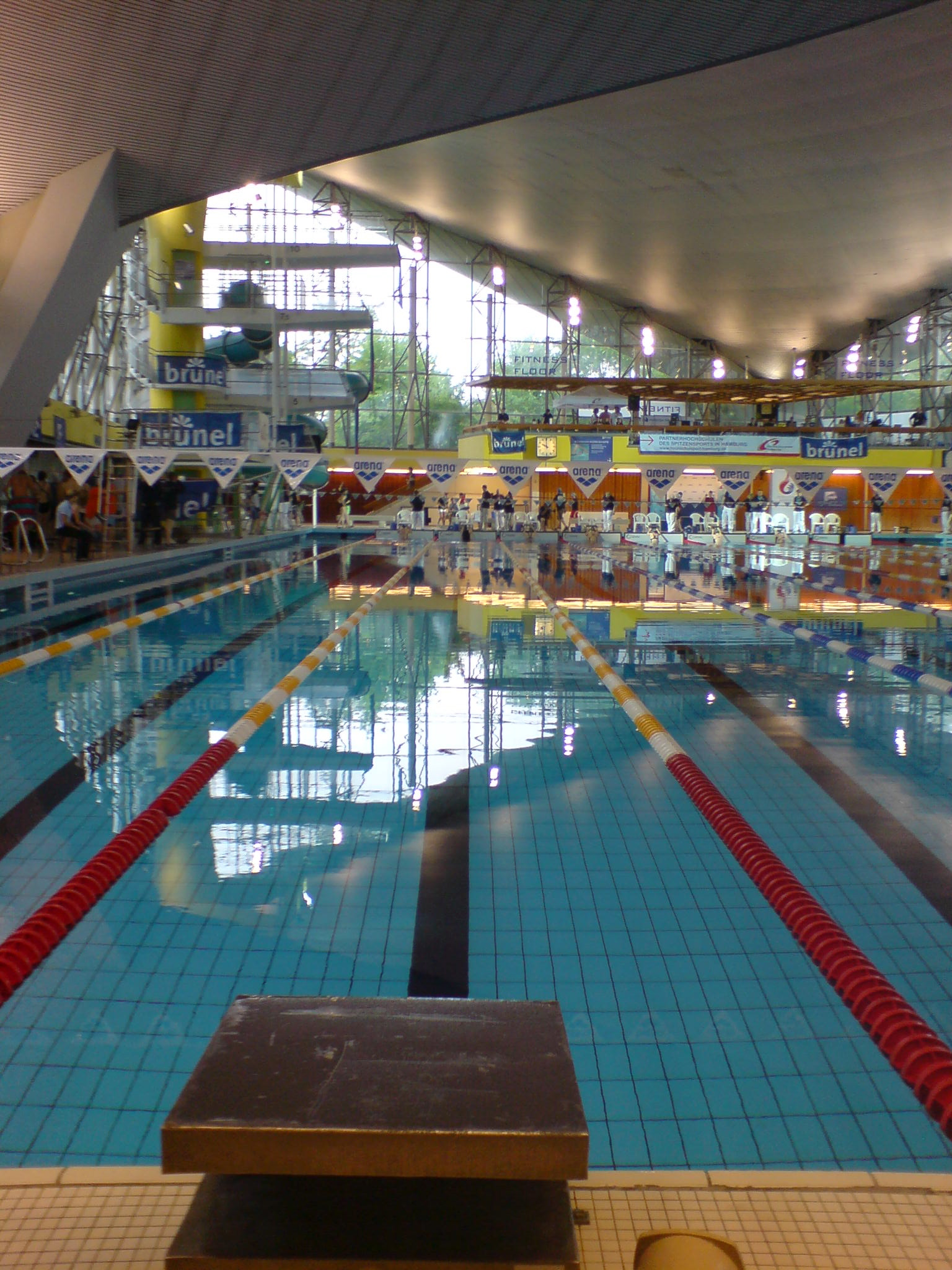
Inside of Alsterschwimmhalle

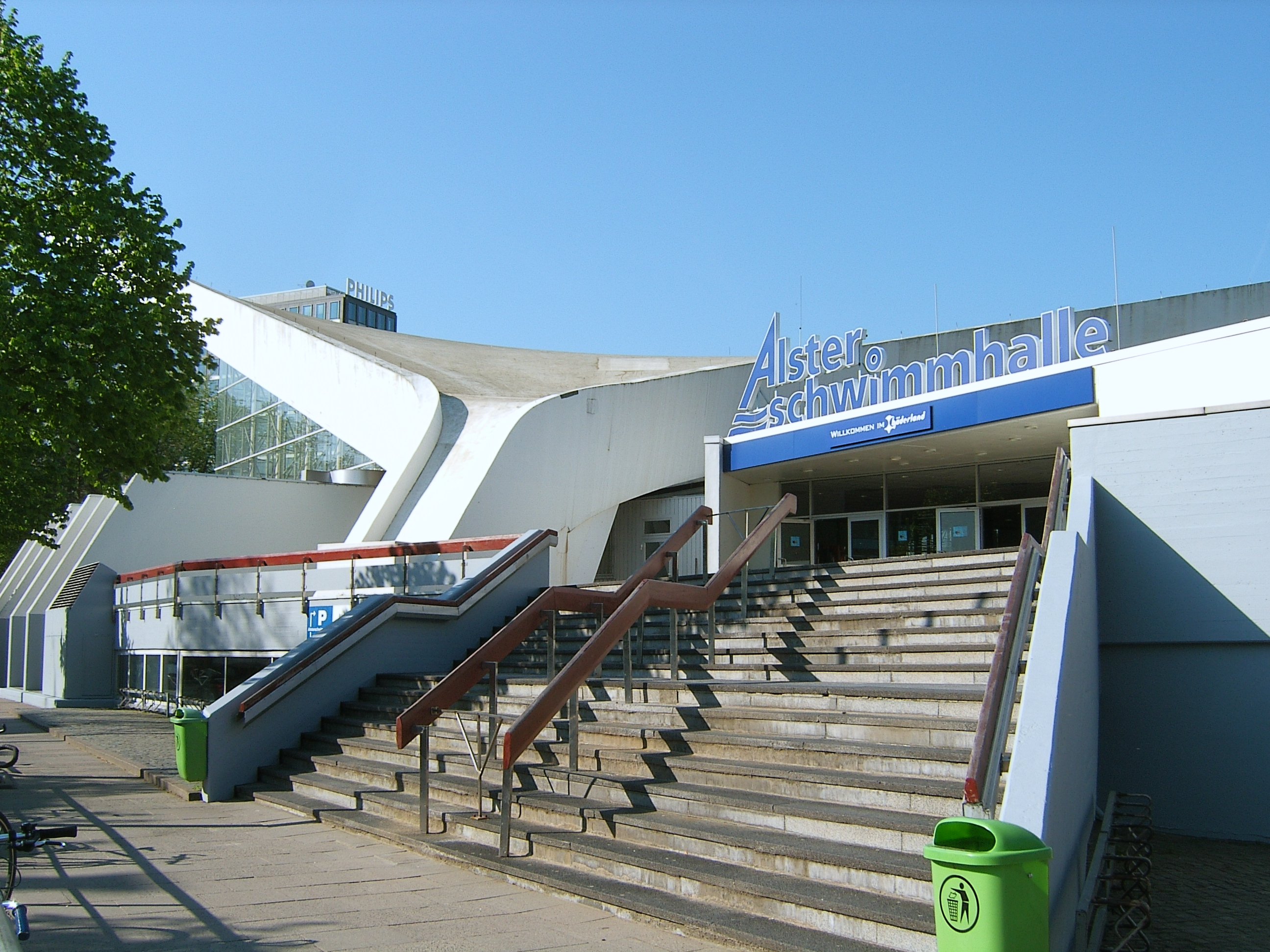
One of entrances of Alsterschwimmhalle

=== Aquatics ===
- indoor long course swimming pool: 50 m (164 ft 1 in) length by 25 m (82 ft 0 in) width; the pool's depth is between 1,8 m and 5,0 m
- indoor multi-purpose & aquafitness pool: 25 m (82 ft 0 in) length by 10 m (32 ft 10 in) width; the pool's depth is between 0,9 m and 1,3 m
- indoor diving platforms: at 1,0 m, 3,0 m, 5,0 m, 7,5 m and 10,0 m height
- indoor water slide: at a length of 76 m
- heated, outdoor swimming pool: 145m² area; the pool's depth is 1,35 m

=== Other amenities ===
- workout and fitness studios
- 3 Finnish saunas, 2 aroma saunas
- steam baths, hot and cold tubs
- phonothek, indoor and outdoor resting areas, lawn
- sauna bar, sun deck, restaurant
- day spa and massage service
