= Chris J. K. Williams =

British structural engineer

- Born: Christopher J. K. Williams
- Known for: shell structures, gridshells, optimisation, geometry

Academic work
- Discipline: Engineer
- Institutions: University of Bath, Chalmers University of Technology
- Notable works: Queen Elizabeth II Great Court, Savill Building, Multihalle Mannheim, Netherlands Maritime Museum, Gardens by the Bay

Christopher John Kenneth Williams is a British structural engineer and researcher who has specialised in the relationship between geometry and structural action. He works on a range of building types including thin-shell structures, gridshells and tension structures, as well as bridges and towers.

Williams worked for Ove Arup in the 1970s. While at Arup, he was involved with the Mannheim Multihalle (de), a pioneering timber gridshell designed by Frei Otto (1975). He has since devoted most of his career to academia, conducting research and teaching at the University of Bath (from 1976) and at Chalmers University of Technology in Gothenburg, Sweden (since 2016). While at Bath, in collaboration with Deborah Greaves, he researched the effect of wind on fabric, and he continues to work on the effect of wind on flexible structures.

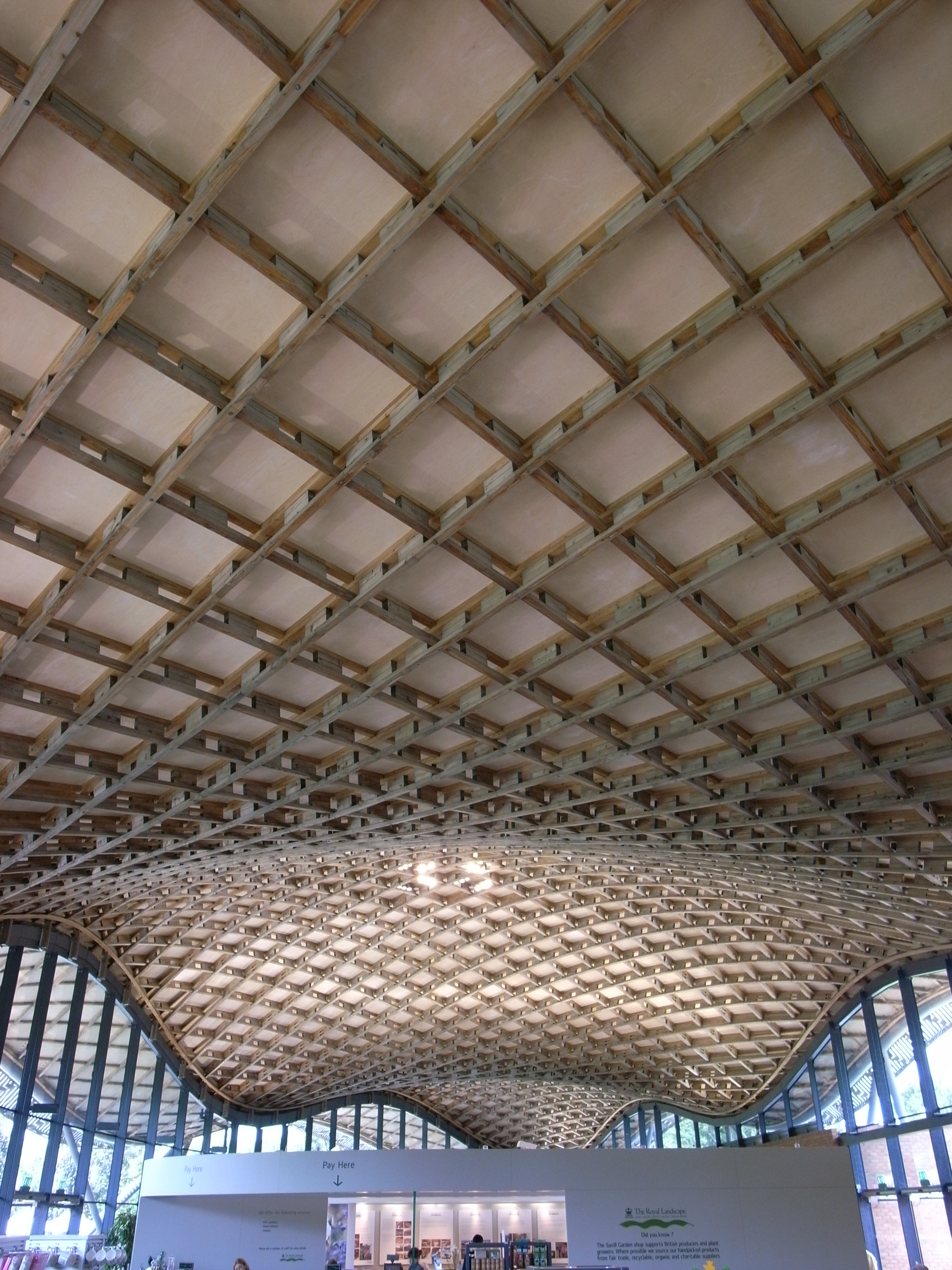
Interior of the gridshell Savill Building

Some of Williams' most notable subsequent contributions include:

- the geometrical form finding and structural analysis for the glass roof covering the Queen Elizabeth II Great Court at the British Museum (2000)
- form finding for the cardboard gridshell of the Japan Pavilion, Hanover Expo 2000, Germany (2000)
- form finding for the Weald and Downland Gridshell (2001)
- the gridshell of Savill Building (2006)
- Gardens by the Bay glasshouses, Singapore (2010)
- the glass roof of the Netherlands Maritime Museum (2011)
- the glass roof of the Chadstone Shopping Centre (2016)

He has collaborated with architects and engineers including Foster + Partners, Rogers Stirk Harbour + Partners, Branson Coates Architecture, Shigeru Ban Architects, Wilkinson Eyre Architects, Edward Cullinan Architects, Arup, Atelier One and Buro Happold.

== Bibliography ==
- S. Adriaenssens, P. Block, D. Veenendaal, and C. Williams, Eds., Shell Structures for Architecture: Form Finding and Optimization. London: Taylor & Francis - Routledge, 2014. ISBN 978-0-415-84060-6
- N. Leach, D. Turnbull, C. J. K. Williams, Eds., Digital Tectonics. Chichester, UK: Wiley, 2004. ISBN 978-0-470-85729-8
