= Edmund Happold =

British engineer, activist (1930–1996)

- Born: 8 November 1930
- Died: 12 January 1996 (aged 65)
- Education: University of Leeds, Bootham School
- Engineering career
- Discipline: Structural engineer, civil engineer
- Institutions: Institution of Structural Engineers; Society of Arts; Design Council; Construction Industry Council; University of Bath
- Practice name: Buro Happold
- Projects: Centre Pompidou
- Awards: IStructE Gold Medal

Sir Edmund Happold (8 November 1930 – 12 January 1996) was a British structural engineer and founder of Buro Happold.

== Career ==
Happold was the son of Frank Happold, Professor of Biochemistry at Leeds University. After an unpleasant time at Leeds Grammar School, (where he had refused, as a pacifist, to join the army-sponsored Junior Training Corps), he was sent to Bootham School, York. He studied geology at the University of Leeds. His mother was a lifelong socialist. A lifelong Quaker, he registered as a conscientious objector when called to do National Service, and was directed to work as an agricultural labourer and then truck driver and dragline operator. This aroused his interest in construction, so he returned to Leeds University, where he achieved a BSc in Civil Engineering in 1957. After graduation, he spent a short time in the office of Alvar Aalto before joining Ove Arup and Partners on the recommendation of architect Basil Spence. At Ove Arup and Partners he worked with Povl Ahm, engineer for St Michael's Cathedral in Coventry. Happold studied architecture in the evenings.

In 1959 Happold moved to work with Fred Severud (a civil engineer whose work included the structural design of Madison Square Garden and the Gateway Arch in St. Louis, and engineer for Eero Saarinen who died June 1990 in Miami Florida) in New York, before returning to London to work with Ove Arup and Partners in 1961. At the time Lambeth's Borough Architect Ted Hollamby was looking for a bright, socially motivated engineer who could assist with the engineering of public buildings and Happold was recommended to the role. Notable developments in Lambeth was the housing estate at Central Hill, at Kennington and the public library and auditorium at West Norwood, which Happold chose as the venue for his marriage to his wife Eve.

After becoming head of Structures 3 at Ove Arup and Partners in 1967, he worked on landmark buildings such as the Sydney Opera House and the Pompidou Centre, of which Richard Rogers said at a lecture at Bath University: 'Of course, it was all Ted's idea'.

He collaborated with Frei Otto, setting up a laboratory to study lightweight tensile structures with Ian Liddell, Vera Straka, Peter Rice and Michael Dickson.

Leaving Arup in 1976 after Arup refused to allow him to start an office in Bath, he became professor of Architecture and Engineering Design at the University of Bath and founded Buro Happold with seven colleagues. He helped set up the Centre for Window and Cladding Technology at Bath, as well as a research group in air-supported structures.

He was appointed a Royal Designer for Industry, a member of the Design Council, Vice-President of the Royal Society of Arts, and Master of the Royal Designer for Industry. He also founded the Building Industry Council, later to become the Construction Industry Council, and was President of the Institution of Structural Engineers in 1986-87. He died at his home in Bath whilst waiting for a heart transplant.

== Awards ==
Amongst other awards, he received the Guthrie Brown Medal in 1970, the Eiffel Medal from the Ecole Centrale de Paris, the Kerensky Medal from the International Association for Bridge and Structural design, and the IStructE Gold Medal in 1991. He was knighted in 1994 for his services to engineering, architecture and education.

== Selected projects ==
- Bootham School, 1964
- Riyadh Conference Centre, 1967
- Hyde Park Barracks, London, 1970
- Blackheath Quaker Meeting House, 1971–1972
- Pompidou Centre, 1971–1977
- Aviary at Tierpark Hellabrunn, Munich, 1978–1982
- Hooke Park, Dorset, 1985–1991
