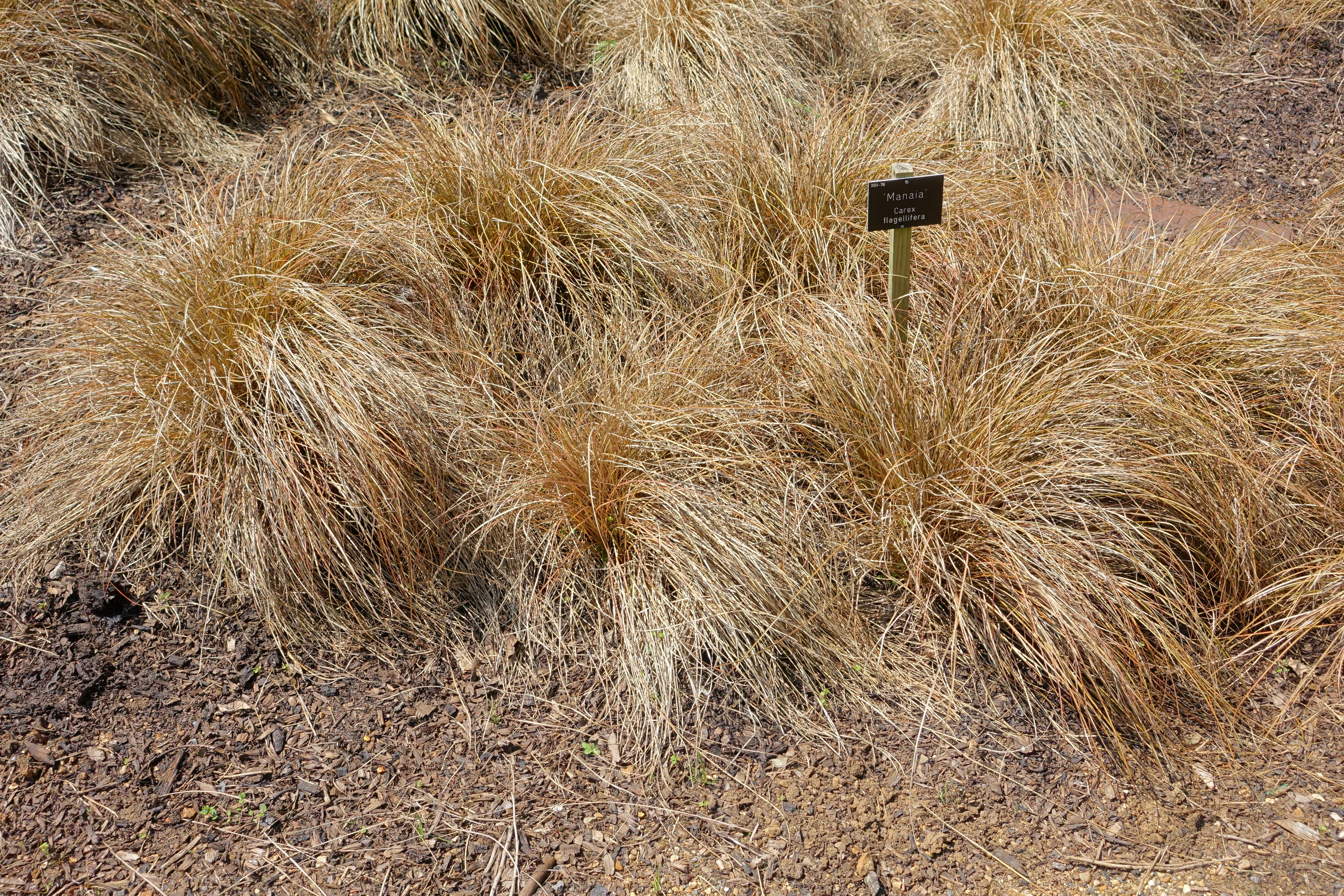
- At Savill Garden, England
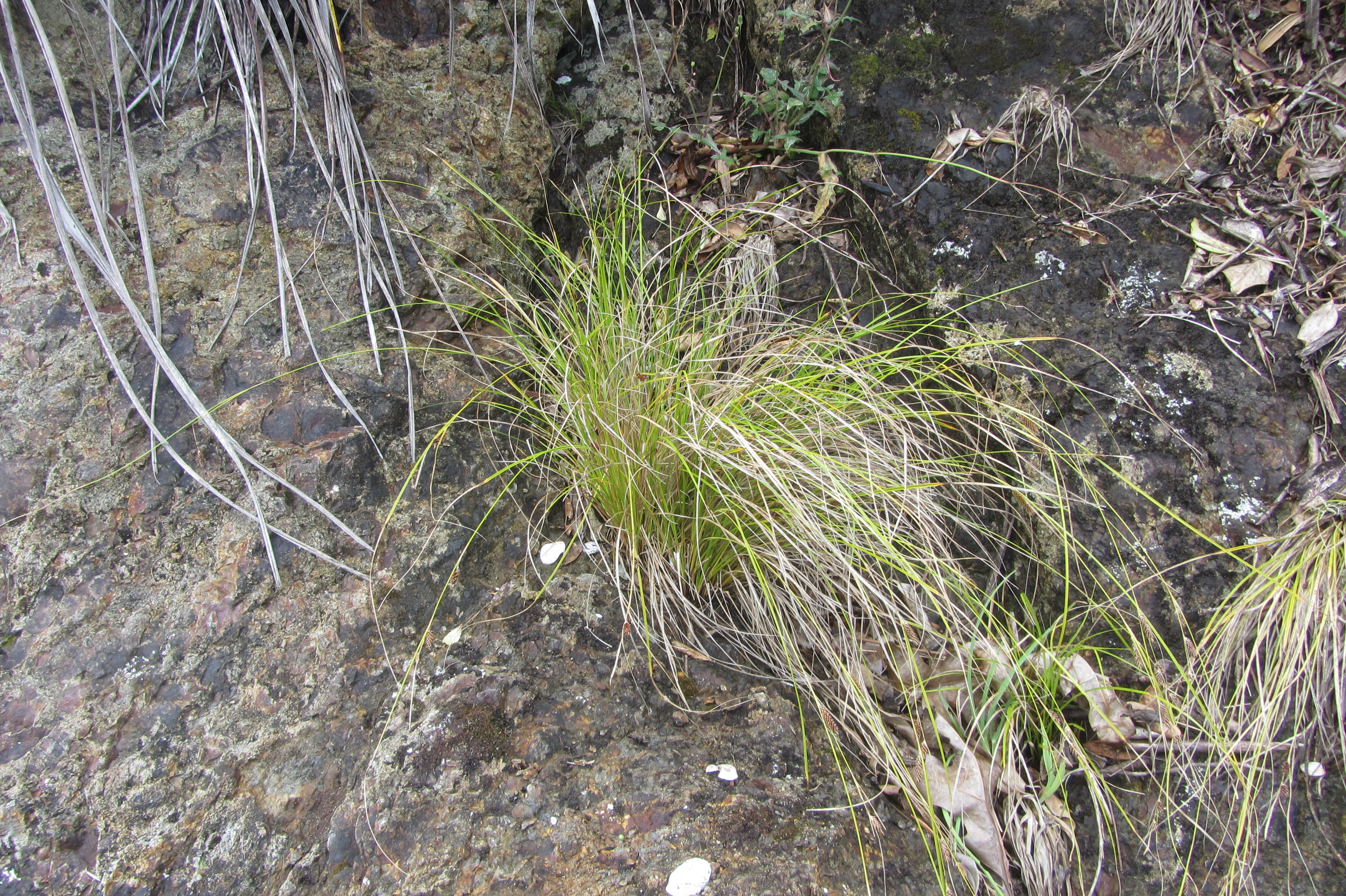
- In the wild, Eastern Northland & Islands Ecological District, New Zealand

Scientific classification
- Kingdom: Plantae
- Clade: Tracheophytes
- Clade: Angiosperms
- Clade: Monocots
- Clade: Commelinids
- Order: Poales
- Family: Cyperaceae
- Genus: Carex
- Species: C. flagellifera

Binomial name
- Carex flagellifera Colenso

Synonyms
- Carex lucida Boott; Carex pulla Sol. ex Boott

= Carex flagellifera =

Species of grass-like plant

Carex flagellifera, the weeping brown sedge or Glen Murray tussock sedge, is a species of flowering plant in the family Cyperaceae.

== Distribution ==
It is native to Tasmania, New Zealand, and the Chatham Islands, and it has been introduced to the Kermadec Islands and Great Britain.

== Cultivars ==
There are a number of cultivars, including 'Auburn Cascade', 'Coca-Cola', 'Frosted Curls', 'Kiwi', 'Rapunzel', and 'Toffee Twist'.
