= British Construction Industry Awards =

British architecture awards

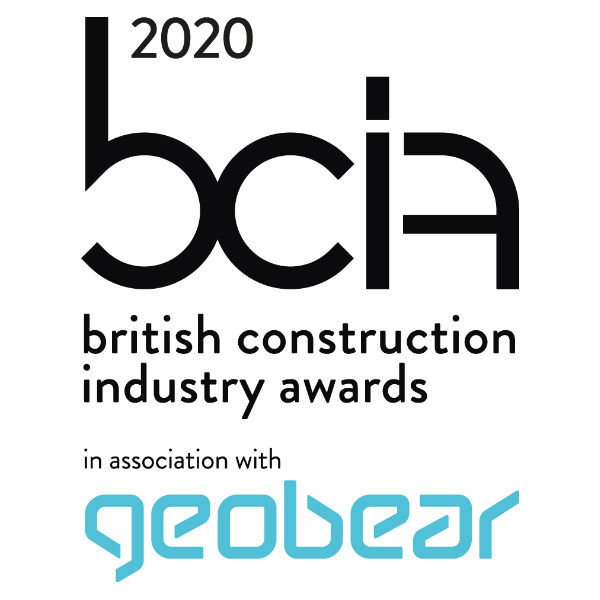
The logo for the British Construction Industry Awards 2020

The British Construction Industry Awards (BCI Awards or BCIA) were launched by New Civil Engineer magazine and Thomas Telford Ltd in 1998, at the time both owned by the Institution of Civil Engineers.

The awards seek to recognise outstanding achievement in the construction of buildings, taking account of a wide range of factors including architectural and engineering design, but also consideration of the construction process, delivery to time and budget, and client satisfaction.

In 2012, Network Rail chief executive Sir David Higgins was the chair of the British Construction Industry Awards judging panel which celebrated its 25th anniversary of rewarding excellence in UK construction delivery.

In June 2017 owners of New Civil Engineer, Ascential, sold the title to Metropolis International who now operate the BCIAs in association with the Institution of Civil Engineers.

The awards are typically held in October each year. In 2020, the British Construction Industry Awards will be held on the evening of Wednesday 28 October at the JW Marriott Grosvenor House Hotel on Park Lane in London.

== Award winners ==
=== 2019 ===
Award	Company Name	Project/Initiative Title
Initiative Categories
Partnership Initiative of the Year	A14 Integrated Delivery Team	Procurement & Supply Chain Management: Changing Industry Behaviours
Health, Safety & Wellbeing Initiative of the Year	Thames Estuary Asset Management 2100	Thames Estuary Asset Management 2100 (TEAM2100)
Community Engagement Initiative of the Year	Morrisroe Group with Blue Sky Building	Hugh Myddelton Primary School Outdoor Learning Centre and Urban Farm
Digital Transformation Initiative of the Year: Buildings	Atkins	Digital Construction: 3D Reinforcement Modelling for Major Civils Projects applied on Hinkley Point C
Digital Transformation Initiative of the Year: Civil Engineering	A14 Integrated Delivery Team	The A14’s Digital Blueprint for Successful Infrastructure Delivery
Temporary Works Initiative of the Year: Buildings	Robert Bird Group	Bank Station Capacity Upgrade - Temporary Truss for London Underground
Temporary Works Initiative of the Year: Civil Engineering	JBA Bentley	The Foss Barrier: Road to Recovery
Environment & Sustainability Initiative of the Year	Tideway	More by river, applied on Thames Tideway Tunnel
Productivity Initiative of the Year	A14 Integrated Delivery Team	Smart Permit to Dig (SPtD) – a Ground Breaking Process
Equality, Diversity & Inclusion Initiative of the Year	Costain Skanska JV	Improving diversity across our whole workforce on HS2 Enabling works programme-area south
Project Categories
Utility Project of the Year	JN Bentley	North Wales Sludge Strategy
Commercial Property Project of the Year	Hydrock	UK Hydrographic Office, Taunton
Housing Project of the Year	AECOM	Hoxton Press, Colville Estate
Social Infrastructure Project of the Year	Reiach & Hall Architects	The Jack Copland Centre, Edinburgh
Cultural & Leisure Project of the Year	Marks Barfield Architects	Cambridge Central Mosque
Operations & Maintenance Project of the Year	Thames Water/MWH Treatment	King's Scholars Pond Sewer Rehabilitation
Transport Project of the Year	Sunderland Council	Northern Spire
Climate Resilience Project of the Year	Environment Agency	Shoreham Adur Tidal Walls
Special Awards
Initiative of the Year Award	A14 Integrated Delivery Team	A14 Cambridge to Huntingdon Improvement Scheme – A digital blueprint for successful infrastructure delivery
Small Project of the Year Award	Arup	Greener Grangetown
Project of the Year Award	Reiach & Hall Architects	The Jack Copland Centre, Edinburgh

=== 2018 ===
Award	Awarded to	
Award	Company name	Initiative Title
Health, Safety & Wellbeing Initiative of the Year	Tideway in partnership with Active Training Team	EPIC
Community Engagement Initiative of the Year	Arup	Connswater Community Greenway Phase 2
Digital Transformation Initiative of the Year	Jacobs	Thames Estuary Asset Management 2100
Partnership Initiative of the Year	Midland Metro Alliance	Transforming the West Midlands by delivering light rail schemes through collaboration and alliancing
Temporary Works Initiative of the Year (Building)	Wentworth House Partnership	Earls Court Bridge 19 and Main Roof Deconstruction
Temporary Works Initiative of the Year (Civil Engineering)	Kilnbridge Construction Services	Water Street Bridge – Canary Wharf Bridge Abutment Lowering
Carbon Reduction Initiative of the Year	Galliford Try	Tar-Bound Material Recycling - Muse Phases 2 & 3
Productivity in Construction Initiative of the Year	Mace	Rising factory on East Village Project
Skills Impact Initiative of the Year	Transport Scotland	A9 Dualling Programme - Academy9: Building a Legacy
Exporting Expertise Initiative of the Year	Mott MacDonald	Dubai Roads & Transport Authority Strategic BIM Consultancy
Project Categories
Utility Project of the Year	London Power Tunnels Project	
Commercial Property Project of the Year	Westgate Oxford	
Housing Project of the Year	Roussillon Park - Chichester	
Social Infrastructure Project of the Year	Marlborough Primary School	
Cultural & Leisure Project of the Year	Royal Academy of Music	
Infrastructure Maintenance Project of the Year	Chapel Street Bridge Upgrade, Salford	
Transport Project of the Year	London Bridge Station Redevelopment	
Climate Resilience Project of the Year	Milford on Sea Beach Hut Replacement Scheme	
Small Project of the Year	HAR2 Kingsmoor Flood Alleviation Scheme	
Special Awards
The Judges' Special Award	Prior's Court - The Seasons Children's Homes	
The ICE 200 Award	London Bridge Station Redevelopment	

=== 2017 ===
Award	Awarded to
Application and Innovation Categories
Health, Safety & Wellbeing Initiative of the Year	Alford Technologies
Community Engagement Initiative of the Year	Carillion Morgan Sindall Joint Venture
Application of Technology Award	Nomenca
Innovation in Product Design and Technology	Bam, Ferrovial, Kier Joint Venture
Partnership Initiative of the Year	Network Rail, Siemens, AmeySersa and SkanskaBAM
Temporary Works Award	Northern Hub
Project Categories
Civil Engineering Project of the Year (up to £10m)	Tower Bridge - Bascule Re-decking and Approach Viaduct Waterproofing
Civil Engineering Project of the Year (£10m to £50m)	Hampstead Heath Ponds Project
Major Civil Engineering Project of the Year (over £50m)	Tottenham Court Road station Upgrade
Building Project of the Year (up to £10m)	Maggie's at the Robert Parfett Building
Building Project of the Year (£10m to £50m)	ORIAM - Scotland's Sports Performance Centre
Major Building Project of the Year (over £50m)	City of Glasgow College - City Campus
International Project of the Year	Mass Transit Railway (MTR) South Island Line (East), Hong Kong
Carbon Reduction Project of the Year Award	Grafham Resilience
Economic Infrastructure Project of the Year Award	Heysham to M6 Link Road
Social Infrastructure Project of the Year Award	The Word
Special Awards
Award for Natural and Cultural Heritage	Remembrance Centre at the National Memorial Arboretum
The Judges' Special Award	British Airways i360
Outstanding Individual Contribution to the Construction Industry Award	Roger Harding, Director of Real Estate Development, Metropolitan Police Service
The Prime Minister's Award for Better Public Building	New Scotland Yard
The BCIA 30th Anniversary Award	Peter Ayres
The BCIA Lifetime Achievement Award	Hugh Ferguson

=== 2016 ===
Award	Awarded to
Application and Innovation Categories
Application of Technology Award	A1(M) Leeming to Barton, Yorkshire, Carillion Morgan Sindall Joint Venture
Product Design Innovation Award	Brick Slip Masonry Support Systems, IG Masonry Support Systems
Best Practice Initiative	Supply Chain Sustainability School, Action Sustainability
Temporary Works Award (Building)	Paddington Station Spans 1-3 Roof Refurbishment, London
Temporary Works Award (Civil Engineering)	Paddington Crossrail station, London
Project Categories
Building Project of the Year (up to £10m)	Royal Court Theatre, Liverpool
Building Project of the Year (£10m to £50m)	City of Glasgow College, Riverside Campus
Major Building Project of the Year (over £50m)	Sainsbury Welcome Centre for Neural Circuits and Behaviour at UCL, London
Civil Engineering Project of the Year (up to £10m)	West Rhyl Coastal Defence Phase 3
Civil Engineering Project of the Year (£10m to £50m)	London Underground: Baker Street to Bond Street Tunnel Remediation Project VDC
Major Civil Engineering Project of the Year (over £50m)	Thames Water Lee Tunnel, London
International Project of the Year	IMEC FAB 3, Belgium
Special Awards
Health, Safety & Wellbeing Award	London Underground: Baker Street to Bond Street Tunnel Remediation Project VDC
Low Carbon Construction Award	Hebburn Central, Newcastle
Award for Natural and Cultural Heritage	Gloucester Services
Community Engagement Award	South Devon Highway
Judges Special Award	Sacred Heart Cathedral of Kericho Diocese, Kenya
The Prime Ministers Better Public Building Award	Alder Hey Children's Health Park, Liverpool

=== 2015 ===
Award	Awarded to
Application and Innovation Categories
BIM Project Application Award – Building	Balfour Beatty - National Graphene Institute, The University of Manchester
BIM Project Application Award - Civil Engineering	Crossrail - Moving London and BIM Forward
Product Design Innovation Award - Building	ProCure21+ - Repeatable Rooms: Improving Patient Outcomes and Delivering Cost Reduction through Standardisation
Product Design Innovation Award - Building	Safetybank
Product Design Innovation Award - Civil Engineering	BBMV (Balfour Beatty, BeMo Tunnelling, Morgan Sindall, Vinci Joint Venture) - Crossrail C510 Liverpool Street and Whitechapel Station Tunnels
Project Management Award	Edmond Shipway - Center Parcs Woburn Forest Holiday Village
Temporary Works Award	Jackson Civil Engineering - QEII Bridge Joint Replacement Project
Project Categories
Building Project of the Year (up to £10m)	Lancaster University Engineering Building, John McAslan and Partners
Building Project of the Year (£10m to £50m)	Aloft Hotel, Liverpool, Balfour Beatty
Major Building Project of the Year (over £50m)	National Graphene Institute, Ramboll
Civil Engineering Project of the Year (up to £10m)	Church Bridge Reconstruction, Frampton Cotterell, South Gloucestershire, Atkins
Civil Engineering Project of the Year (£10m to £50m)	Suffolk Energy from Waste, Lagan Construction Group
Major Civil Engineering Project of the Year (over £50m)	Manchester Metrolink Phase 3 - Airport Line, Laing O'Rourke
Special Awards
Best Practice Award	Five Pancras Square, Kier Construction - Major Projects
Health & Safety Award	Five Pancras Square, Kier Construction - Major Projects
Sustainability Award	Herne Hill Flood Alleviation Scheme, Southwark Council
International Project Award	Fulton Center, New York, Metropolitan Transport Authority Capital Construction/New York City Transit
Outstanding Contribution Award	Jennie Coombs, LBBD, William Street Quarter and Courtyard Housing
Judges' Special Award	Dawlish Sea Wall Emergency Works, BAM Nuttall
Prime Minister's Better Public Building Award	Five Pancras Square, Kier Construction - Major Projects

=== 2014 ===
Award	Awarded to
BIM Project Application Award	Skanska UK, 66 Queen Square, Bristol
Building Project of the Year (£10m to £50m)	Lifschutz Davidson Sandilands, Bonhams
Building Project of the Year (up to £10m)	Duggan Morris Architects, Ortus
Civil Engineering Project of the Year (£10m to £50m)	Team Van Oord, Medmerry Managed Realignment
Civil Engineering Project of the Year (up to £10m)	Welsh Water, Morgan Sindall and Arup, Llanelli Green Infrastructure Project
International Project of the Year	Mott MacDonald, The Sindh Water Sector Improvement Project
Health & Safety Award	Reading Train Care Depot Implementation Works
Judges' special Award	The Pirbright Institute DP1 Project
Major Building Project of the Year (over £50m)	Arup, London Aquatics Centre
Major Civil Engineering Project of the Year (over £50m)	United Utilities, MWH, B&V, United Utilities Sludge Balanced Asset Programme (SBAP)
Outstanding Contribution Award	Godmanchester Flood Risk Management Scheme
Product Design Innovation Award	Siniat, GTEC Weather Defence at Abercynon Community Primary School
Programme Management Award	Crossrail
Sustainability Award	Scottish Water - The Bridge
Temporary Works Award (Building)	Wentworth House Partnership, Part of Keltbray Group, 8-10 Moorgate
Temporary Works Award (Civil Engineering)	Tony Gee and Partners LLP, Singapore Sports Hub - National Stadium
The Prime Minister's Better Public Building Award	Team Van Oord, Medmerry Managed Realignment

=== 2013 ===
Award	Awarded to
Building Project of the Year (up to £3m)	Edward King Chapel, Ripon College Cuddesdon
Building Project of the Year (£3m to £50m)	Newlands School
Major Building Project of the Year (over £50m)	The Shard at Southwark
Civil Engineering Project of the Year (up to £3m)	Gem Bridge, Tavistock, Devon
Civil Engineering Project of the Year (£3m to £50m)	Hammersmith Flyover Strengthening Phase 1
Best Practice Award	Thameslink Programme - Borough Market Viaduct
Regeneration Award	Eastside City Park
Sustainability Award	The Hive, Worcester
Health & Safety Award	M4/M5, Managed motorways in the United Kingdom
International Award	British Antarctic Survey Halley Research Station, Brunt Ice Shelf, Antarctica
Leader of Tomorrow	Conall Doherty, Buro Happold
BIM Project Application Award (Civil Engineering)	Crossrail BIM Initiative
BIM Project Application Award (Building)	Skanska UK, Woodlands School, Essex
Product Design Innovation Award	Byrne Group Falsework Release Tool
Judges' Special Award	The London 2012 Olympic Park Project
Outstanding Contribution Award	London Underground
The Prime Minister's Better Public Building Award	Manchester Metropolitan University Business School & Student Hub

=== 2012 ===
Award	Awarded to
NCE 40th Anniversary Award - Impact on Society	Olympic Delivery Authority
Building Project of the Year (up to £3m)	Garsington Opera Pavilion, Stokenchurch
Major Building Project of the Year (£3m to £50m)	'Dundee House' of Dundee City Council, Scotland
Major Building Project of the Year (over £50m)	University of the Arts London Campus for Central Saint Martins at Kings Cross, London
Civil Engineering Project of the Year (up to £3m)	Taunton Third Way Bridge
Civil Engineering Project of the Year (£3m to £50m)	Brighton Goods Bridge No.6, Battersea, London
Major Civil Engineering Project of the Year (over £50m)	New Tyne Crossing, Newcastle upon Tyne
International Award	West Gate Bridge Strengthening, Melbourne, Victoria, Australia
Environmental Award	White Cart Water Flood Prevention Scheme, Glasgow
Best Practice Award	Quadrant 3, Air 1 Offices, London
Regeneration Award	Bradford City Park
Conservation Award	King's Cross station Redevelopment, London
ICE President's Award for Energy Infrastructure	The European Marine Energy Centre
BIM Project Application Award	Victoria Station Upgrade
Product Design Innovation Award	ACO StormBrixx
Judges Special Award	McLaren Production Centre, Woking
BCIA 25th Anniversary Award	Arup
Prime Minister's Better Public Building Award	University College Hospital Macmillan Cancer Centre, London

=== 2011 ===
Award	Awarded to
Small Building Project Award for projects up to £3m)	Sports Canopy, The National Tennis Centre, Roehampton
Small Civil Engineering project Award for projects up to £3m	London Underground, Bridge D83A Replacement, Hammersmith, London
Building Project Award for projects from £3m to £50m	Ravensbourne (college), Greenwich Peninsula, London
Civil Engineering Project Award for projects from £3m to £50m	High Knocke Estate to Dymchurch Sea Defences, Kent
Major Project Award for projects over £50m	Royal Shakespeare Theatre and Swan Theatre (Stratford)
Major Civil Engineering Project Award for projects over £50m	A421 Improvements M1 Junction 13 to Bedford
International Award	Aviva Stadium, Dublin
Local Authority Award	Redhayes Cycle and footbridge, Exeter
BCIA Environmental Award	Broadland Flood Alleviation Project, Norwich, Norfolk
Regeneration Award	Anne Mews - King William Street Quarter, Barking, Essex
Conservation Award	Theatre Royal Bath
Best Practice Award	Anglian Water AMP4 Biosolids Programme, Great Billing, Northamptonshire
Judges' Special Award	Far Moor Bridge, Selside, North Yorkshire Dales
The Prime Minister's Better Public Building Award	Velodrome, Olympic Park, London

=== 2010 ===
Award	Awarded to
The Prime Minister's Better Public Building Award	New Stobhill Hospital for NHS Greater Glasgow and Clyde
Small Building Project Award	Lowther Children's Centre, London Borough of Richmond
Small Civil Engineering Project Award	Construction of the Temporary Crossing of the River Derwent at Workington (Barker Crossing)
Building Award	CircleBath and Kentish Town Health Centre
Civil Engineering Award	A40 Western Avenue Bridges Replacement
Major Project Award	Ropemaker Place
Best Practice Award	M25 Bell Common Tunnel
Local Authority Award	Cathodic protection of Runcorn's Silver Jubilee Bridge
Conservation Award	Medieval & Renaissance Galleries, Victoria and Albert Museum
Environmental Award	Castle Howard, North Yorkshire
Regeneration Award	East London Line Project
Judges' Special Award	London 2012 Olympic Park Enabling Works Project
International Award	Delhi International Airport renewal

=== 2005 ===
Award	Awarded to
The Prime Minister's Better Public Building Award	Jubilee Library, Brighton
Small Building Project Award	Kingsmead Primary School, Northwich, Cheshire
Small Civil Engineering Project Award	Bridges 2/11 & 2/12 Reconstruction, Battersea
Building Award	Jubilee Library, Brighton
Civil Engineering Award	Chingford South Water Treatment Works
Major Project Award	Tinsley Viaduct Strengthening, Sheffield
Best Practice Award	Kingsmead Primary School, Northwich, Cheshire
Local Authority Award	The Sage, Gateshead
Conservation Award	Government Offices Great George Street, London
Environmental Award	Scrayingham Ecological Waste Water Treatment System, North Yorkshire
Regeneration Award	The Hub Community Centre, Canning Town, London
Judges' Special Award	Unlocking the Archives, Royal Geographical Society, London
International Award	Taiwan High Speed Rail Project

=== 2004 ===
Award	Awarded to
The Prime Minister's Award	A650 Bingley Relief Road
Small Building Project Award	Hoyle Early Years Centre, Bury
Small Civil Engineering Project Award	Moy Viaduct, Inverness
Building Award	Wolfson Medical School Building for the University of Glasgow
Civil Engineering Award	A650 Bingley Relief Road
Major Project Award	Channel Tunnel Rail Link, Section 1
Best Practice Award	Raines Court, London N16
Local Authority Award	Masshouse Circus Redevelopment, Birmingham
Conservation Award	LSO St Luke's the UBS & LSO Music Education Centre
Environmental Award	Newton's Cove Coast Protection Scheme, Weymouth
Regeneration Award	Bullring, Birmingham
Judges' Special Award	New Accommodation Project, GCHQ Cheltenham
International Award	KCRC West Rail, Mei Foo Station

=== 2003 ===
Award	Awarded to
The Prime Minister's Better Public Building Award	Bournemouth Library
Small Project Award	Cowgate Under 5s Centre, Edinburgh
Building Award	Imperial War Museum North, Manchester
Civil Engineering Award	Tay Bridge Refurbishment, Dundee
Major Project Award	Centre for Mathematical Sciences, Cambridge
Best Practice Award	Newburn riverside reclamation and infrastructure, Newcastle Upon Tyne
Special Award for innovation in concept, design and execution	The Bridge of Aspiration, Royal Ballet School, London
International Award	Bangladesh-UK Friendship Bridge

=== 2002 ===
Award	Awarded to
The Prime Minister's Building Award	City Learning Centre, Bristol
Major Project Award	Channel Tunnel Rail Link, Ashford
Civil Engineering Award	Tamar Bridge, Plymouth
Building Award	Honda's European Plant, Swindon
Small Project Award	Weald and Downland Gridshell, Chichester
Best Practice Award	Chiswick Park
International Award	Boston Central Artery Jacked Tunnels

== See also ==
- List of engineering awards
