= Weald and Downland Gridshell =

Coordinates: 50°54′25″N 0°45′22″W

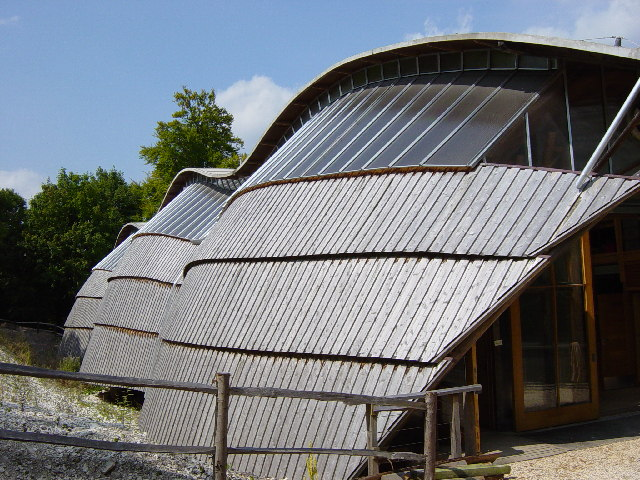
- The Gridshell building

General information
- Type: Museum
- Location: Weald and Downland Open Air Museum, Singleton, West Sussex, England
- Completed: 2002

Technical details
- Structural system: Gridshell

Design and construction
- Architect(s): Edward Cullinan Architects
- Structural engineer: Buro Happold
- Services engineer: Buro Happold

The Weald and Downland Gridshell (2002) is a building designed by Buro Happold and Edward Cullinan Architects for the Weald and Downland Open Air Museum: it was shortlisted for the Stirling Prize in 2002. The building is a structural wooden gridshell, constructed of oak sourced from Normandy, and cladded with local cedar. Before constructing the gridshell, members of Buro Happold and the Cullinan practice-built a prototype during their own time on weekends. This was also a self-supporting gridshell, and was used as a temporary entrance canopy on the Pompidou Centre in Paris.

== Awards ==
The project has won the following awards:

- RIBA Regional Architecture Award 2002.
- Runner-up for the RIBA Stirling Prize 2003.
- IStructE David Alsop Commendation 2003.
- British Construction Industry Awards 2002. Winner of the Small Project category.
- American Institute of Architects, Excellence in Design Award 2003.
- Civic Trust Award for outstanding contribution to the quality and appearance of the environment.
- Sussex Heritage Trust 2003. Winner Commercial and Industrial Category.
- Wood Awards 2003. Gold Award Winner.
- Wood Awards 2003. Structural Category Winner.
- European Wood Facade Contest Award given by the Nordic Timber Council.
