= Savill Garden =

Enclosed part of Windsor Great Park in Surrey, England

Coordinates: 51.4291°N 0.5990°W

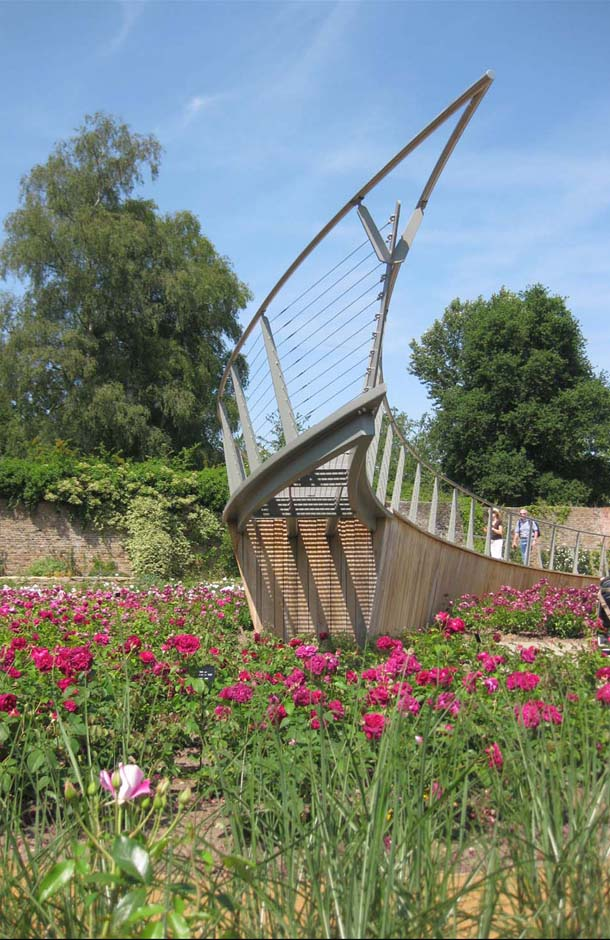
View of the elevated walkway in the new rose garden at Savill Garden, Windsor Great Park

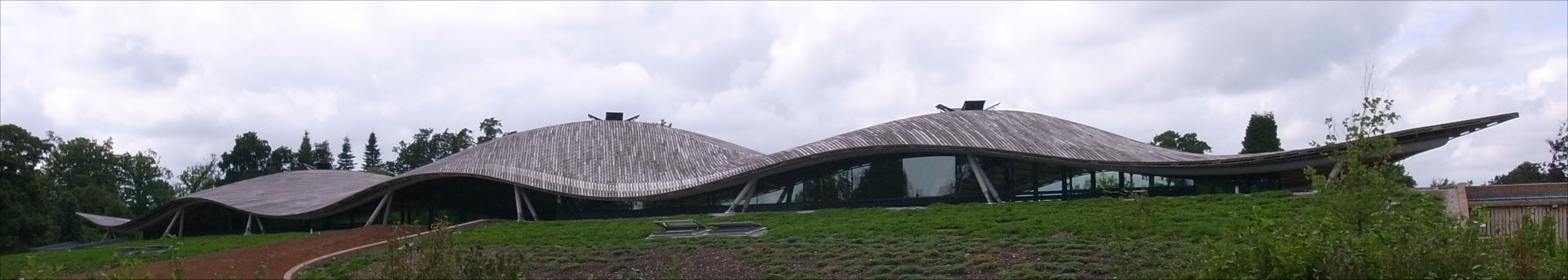
The front of the Savill Building – entrance to the garden.

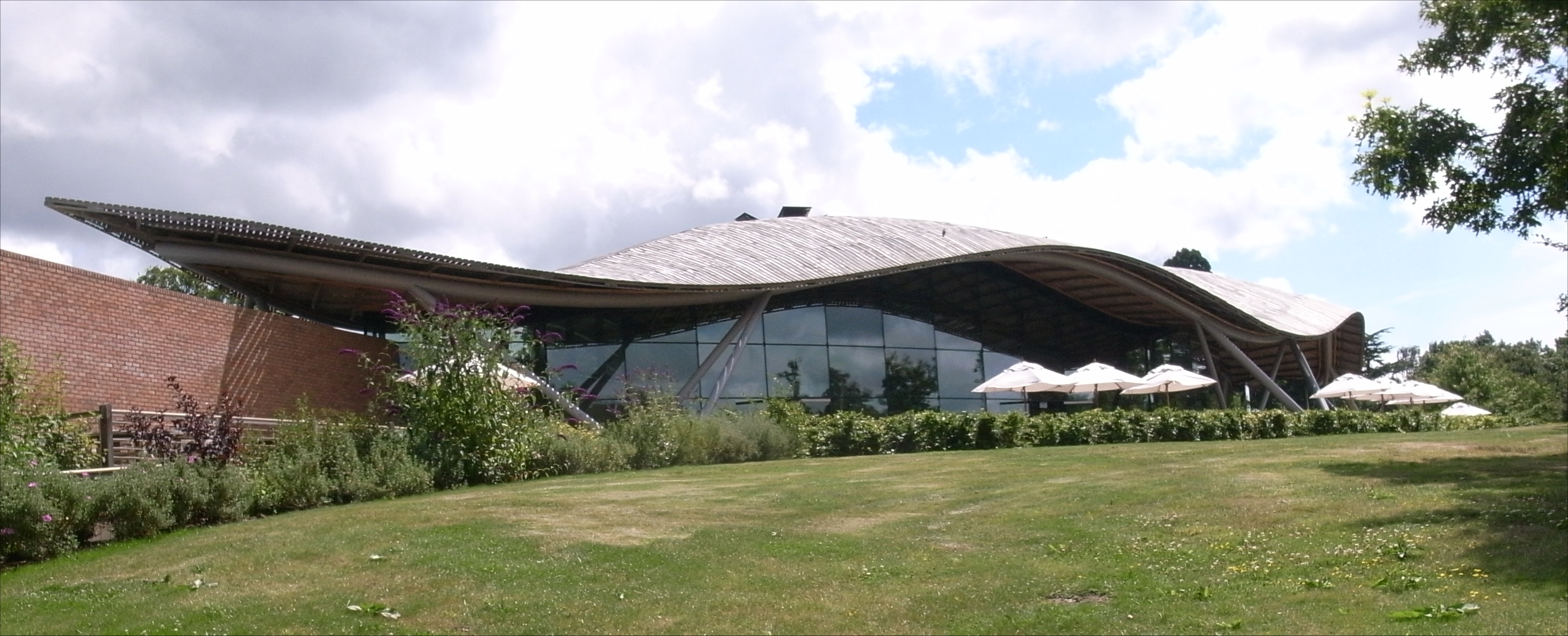
The Savill Building from the garden.

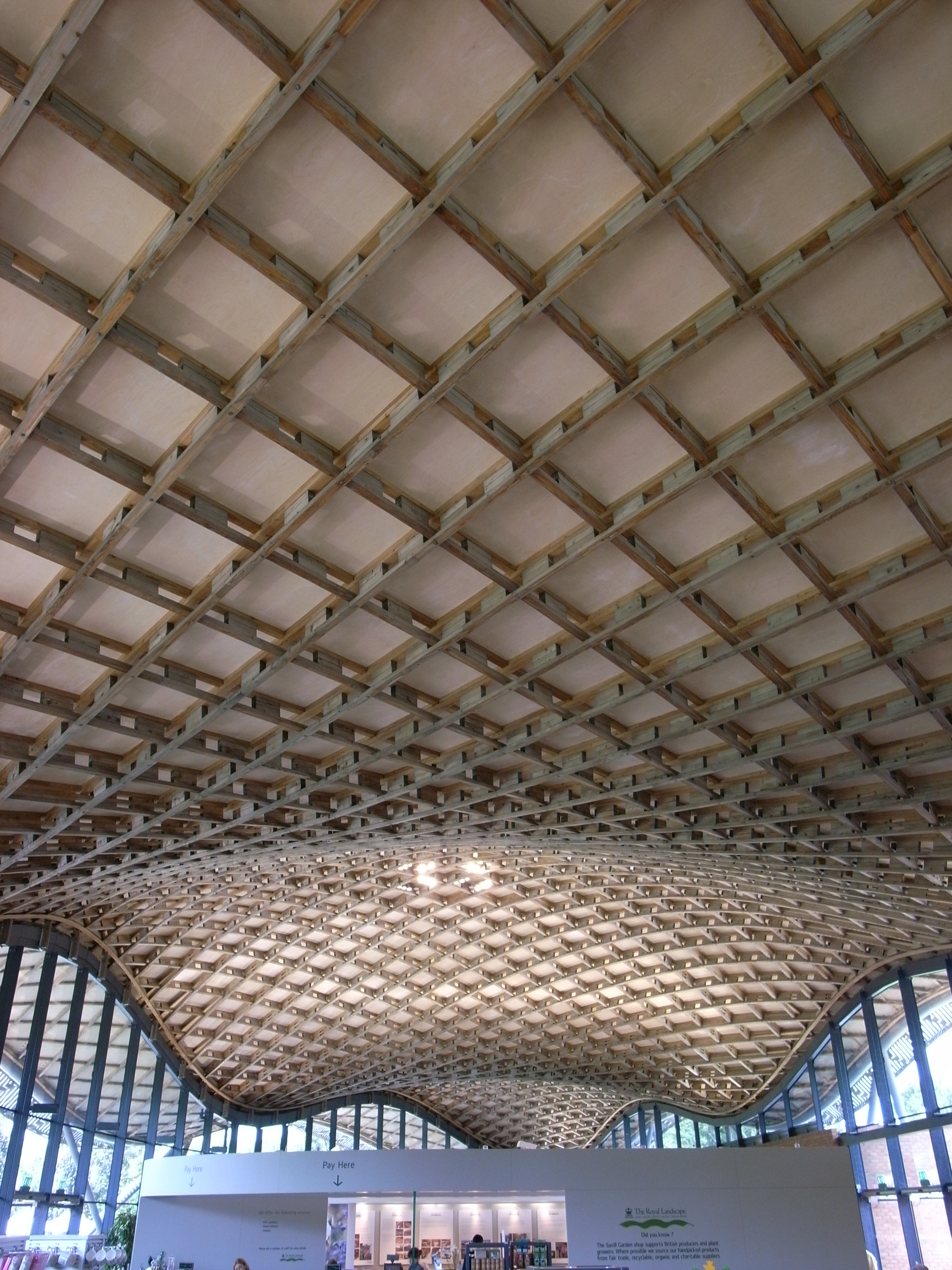
The wooden Gridshell roof from inside the building.

The Savill Garden is an enclosed part of Windsor Great Park in England, created by Sir Eric Savill in the 1930s. It is managed by the Crown Estate and charges an entrance fee. The garden includes woodland, ornamental areas and a pond. The attractions include the New Zealand Garden, the Queen Elizabeth Temperate House and trees planted by members of the Royal Family. In June 2010, a new contemporary rose garden designed by Andrew Wilson and Gavin McWilliam of Wilson McWilliam Studio was opened by Queen Elizabeth II.

Eric Savill (1895–1980) was the grandson of Alfred Savill the founder of a large firm of estate agents. He fought in the First World War, and in 1916 his life was saved by Theodore Veale in an act of exceptional gallantry for which Veale was awarded the Victoria Cross. Savill was involved in managing Windsor Great Park, initially as Deputy Ranger from 1930, and then Director of Gardens from 1962 to 1970. He founded the National Collection of magnolias in the park, and also two gardens, one later called the Savill Garden, opened to the public in 1951. Savill was awarded a knighthood in 1955.

In June 2006, a specially designed new visitor centre, the Savill Building by Glenn Howells Architects was opened. The timber for the floor and roof came from the Windsor Estate.

The Savill Garden and the nearby Valley Gardens are Grade I listed on the Register of Historic Parks and Gardens.
