= Ian Liddell =

British civil servant (born 1938)

Ian Liddell CBE FREng FIStructE Hon FRIBA
- Born: William Ian Liddell; 1938 (age 87–88)
- Education: Cambridge University, UK and Imperial College, London, UK
- Engineering career
- Discipline: Structural engineer, Engineering design
- Institutions: Fellow of the Institution of Structural Engineers, Member of the Institution of Civil Engineers, Fellow of the Royal Academy of Engineering, Honorary Fellow of the Royal Institution of British Architects
- Practice name: Buro Happold
- Projects: Sydney Opera House; Timber Gridshell, Mannheim, Germany; Millennium Dome, London; The Globe Theatre, London; The State Mosque, Sarawak
- Awards: CBE, IStructE Gold Medal, Royal Academy of Engineering, MacRobert Award, Award of Merit in Structural Engineering

William Ian Liddell (born 1938) is a British structural engineer and the designer of London's Millennium Dome. He was one of the founding partners of Buro Happold and is a Royal Academy Visiting Professor of Engineering Design at Cambridge University School of Engineering. He is now a consultant for Buro Happold.

He studied mechanical sciences at St John's College, Cambridge followed by a diploma in concrete structures at Imperial College, London.

He was project engineer on the Sydney Opera House, playing a significant role in the formfinding of the iconic roofs. He received the IStructE Gold Medal in 1999.

For his work as Chief Design Engineer on London's Millennium Dome project, he was appointed Commander of the Most Excellent Order of the British Empire (CBE) in the 1999 New Year Honours.

He is a trustee of the Arkwright Scholarships Trust and the Smallpeice Trust.
