= Michael Dickson (engineer) =

British structural engineer (1944–2018)

Michael Dickson CBE FREng FIStructE FICE
- Born: Michael George Tufnell Dickson; 22 September 1944
- Died: 28 May 2018 (aged 73)
- Education: Cambridge University, UK and Cornell University, Ithaca, New York, United States
- Engineering career
- Discipline: Structural engineer
- Institutions: Fellow of the Institution of Structural Engineers, Fellow of the Institution of Civil EngineersFellow of the Royal Academy of Engineering, Honorary Fellow of the Royal Institution of British Architects, Fellow of Royal Society of Arts
- Practice name: Buro Happold
- Projects: Japanese Pavilion at Expo 2000, Hanover, Germany; Stuttgart 21; Al Faisaliyah Center, Saudi Arabia; Munich Aviary, Germany
- Awards: Commander of the Order of the British Empire

Michael Geoerge Tufnell Dickson (22 September 1944 – 28 May 2018) was a British structural engineer and a founding partner of Buro Happold. He was a Visiting Professor of Engineering Design at the University of Bath Department of Architecture and Civil Engineering.

He studied mechanical sciences (the precursor of engineering) at Cambridge University followed by structural engineering and town planning at Cornell University in the United States. In 2007 he was awarded an Honorary Doctor of Engineering from the University of Bath.

He became chairman of Buro Happold in 1996, and held the post until April 2005, when he resigned from the partnership, and was chairman of the Happold Trust, a charitable trust funded by Buro Happold. From 2000 to 2002 he was Chairman of the Construction Industry Council and from 2005 to 2006 he was the President of the Institution of Structural Engineers. He also chaired the New Construction Research and Innovation Strategy Panel from 2003-2005.

Dickson died on 28 May 2018 after a short illness.
