= Buro Happold =

British professional services firm

Buro Happold Limited
- Type: Private
- Industry: Construction
- Founded: 1976; 50 years ago
- Founder: Sir Edmund Happold
- Headquarters: Bath, Somerset, United Kingdom
- Number of locations: 37
- Area served: Worldwide
- Key people: Oliver Plunkett (CEO); Marc Barone (COO); Craig Schwitter (senior partner & chair of the global board); Sam Murray (CFO); Karen O'Brien (Chief people officer); Alain Waha (CTO)
- Products: Services; Software
- Services: engineering consulting, and specialist consulting services
- Revenue: GB£363.0 million (2024)
- Number of employees: 3,500
- Website: www.burohappold.com

Buro Happold Limited (previously BuroHappold Engineering) is a British professional services firm that provides engineering consultancy, design, planning, project management, and consulting services for buildings, infrastructure, and the environment. It was founded in Bath, Somerset, in 1976 by Sir Edmund Happold when he took up a post at the University of Bath as Professor of Architecture and Engineering Design.

Originally working mainly on projects in the Middle East, the firm now operates worldwide and in almost all areas of engineering for the built environment, working in 24 locations around the world.

== Sir Edmund Happold ==
Edmund (or Ted) Happold worked at Arup before founding Buro Happold, where he worked on projects such as the Sydney Opera House and the Pompidou Centre. Ted Happold was renowned within the field of lightweight and tensile structures. As a result, Buro Happold has undertaken a large number of tensile and other lightweight structures since its founding (including the Millennium Dome). Ted Happold died in 1996, but the firm claims to maintain his views on engineering and life.

== History ==
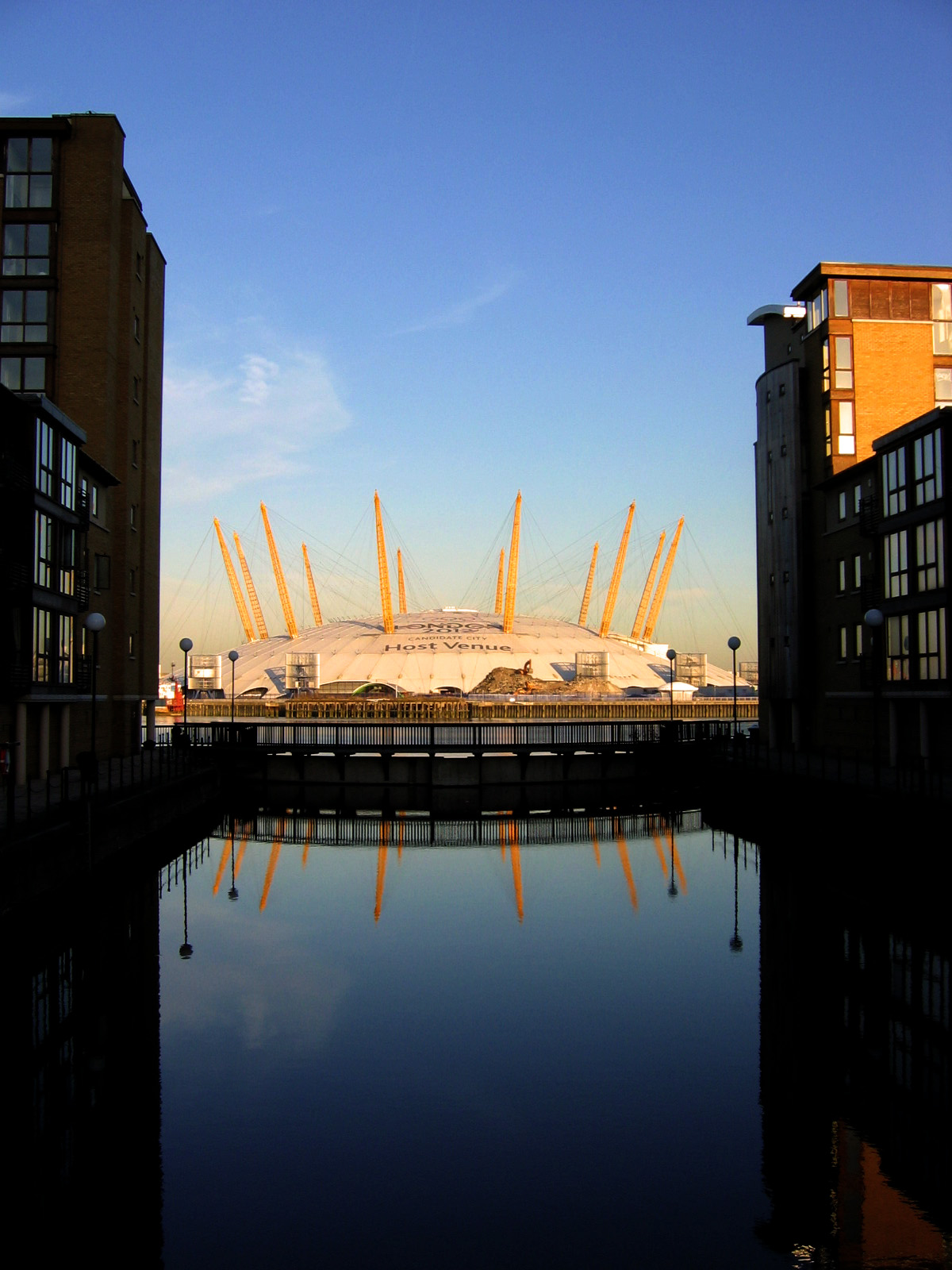
Millennium Dome

Buro Happold was founded on 1 May 1976, with its first office on Gay Street in Bath, United Kingdom. The firm started with eight partners:

- Edmund Happold
- Peter Buckthorp
- Michael Dickson
- Terry Ealey
- Ian Liddell
- Rod Macdonald
- John Morrison
- John Reid

The King's Office, Council of Ministers and Majlis Al Shura (KOCOMMAS), Central Government Complex in Riyadh, Saudi Arabia was the firm's first major design project in 1976. Initially, Buro Happold offered only structural engineering consultancy, with a particular strength in lightweight structures, but in 1977 it added civil engineering and geotechnical engineering and in 1978 building services engineering. In 1982, Buro Happold started to work with Future Tents Ltd (FTL) on a variety of temporary and recreational structures. The firms combined their operations in 1992, but split again in 1997.

In 1983, Buro Happold opened an office in Riyadh, and has since opened offices around the UK and internationally:

- 1976 Bath
- 1983 Riyadh
- 1989 Leeds
- 1990 London
- 1991 Berlin
- 1996 Glasgow
- 1997 Warsaw
- 1999 New York City
- 1999 Manchester
- 2000 Dublin
- 2003 Birmingham
- 2004 Dubai
- 2006 Edinburgh
- 2006 Los Angeles
- 2006 Belfast
- 2007 Munich
- 2007 Boston
- 2007 Toronto
- 2008 Cairo
- 2008 Munich
- 2008 Copenhagen
- 2009 Abu Dhabi
- 2009 Hong Kong
- 2009 Jeddah
- 2009 Kuwait
- 2009 Mumbai
- 2010 San Francisco
- 2010 Chicago
- 2011 Beijing
- 2012 Pittsburgh
- 2018 Detroit
- 2019 Rotterdam
- 2020 Hyderabad
- 2020 Jakarta
- 2021 Minneapolis
- 2021 Seattle
- 2021 Washington D.C.
- 2022 Atlanta
- 2022 Melbourne
- 2022 Bengaluru
- 2023 Hamburg
- 2023 Cambridge

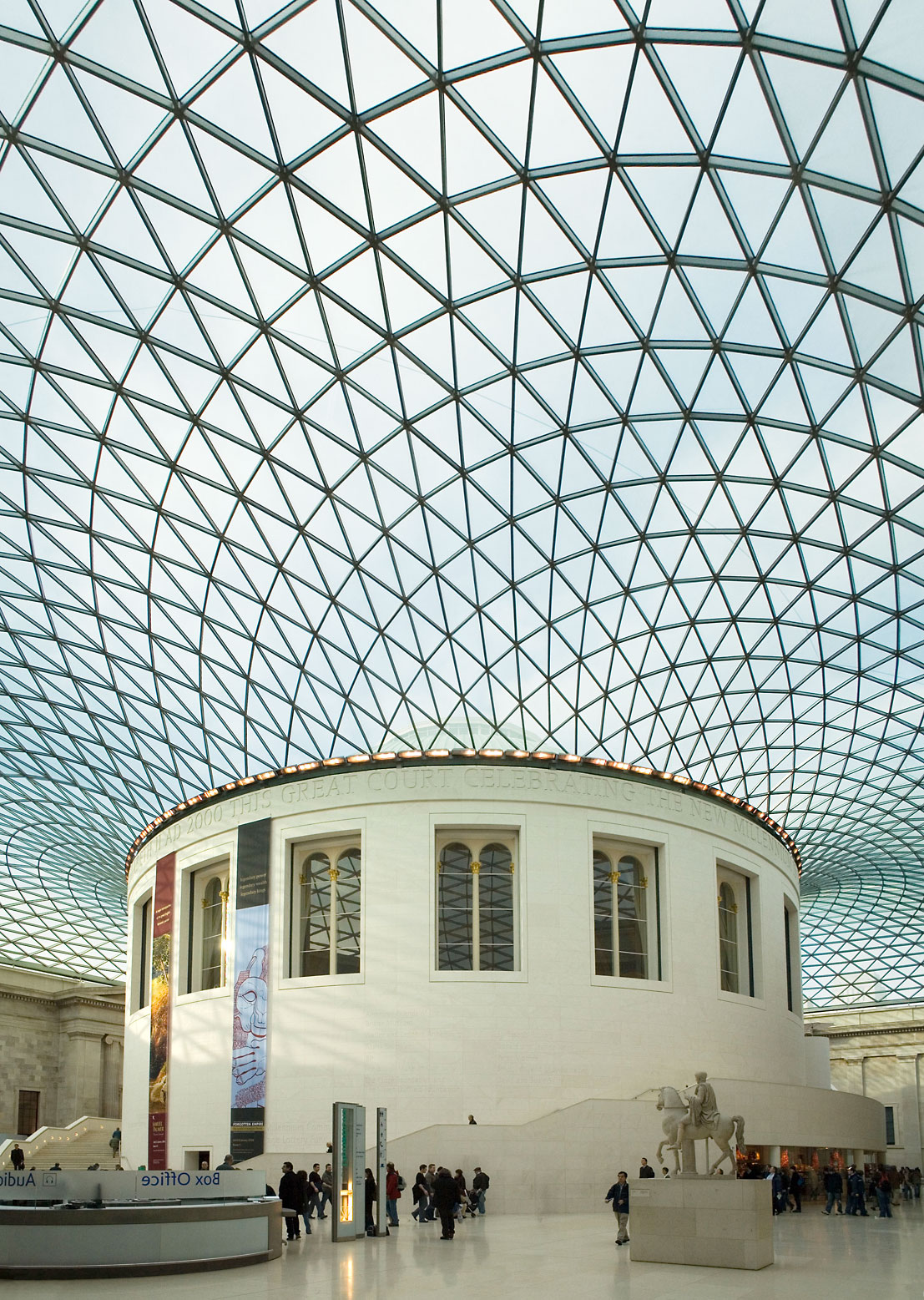
View of the Great Court, British Museum, London.

By 1993, Buro Happold had 130 employees and eight partners. In 1998, this had grown to 300 employees and 12 partners, while in 2000 with over 500 employees the partnership was increased to 23. In 2006, the partnership stood at 25 with over 1,400 employees and 14 offices. Due to this growth and the addition of so many different services, the company was restructured in 2003 to consist of multi-disciplinary teams of engineers, each with structural, mechanical and electrical engineers supported by specialist consulting groups.

In 2005, Buro Happold launched Happold Consulting, a management and overseas development consultancy with expertise in the construction sector, and Happold Media, a subsidiary offering graphic design and media development services.

One of its specialist consultancy services is the fire consultancy group, FEDRA, and software development group SMART which worked with The University of Sheffield to develop Vulcan software, widely used throughout the fire engineering industry. SMART also develops Buro Happold's in-house software Tensyl, a non-linear finite element analysis and patterning program for fabric structures, and people flow modelling software. Also notable is its group COSA, which undertakes computational modelling and analysis and the Sustainability and Alternative Technologies Group.

In 2007, Buro Happold became a limited liability partnership, and in 2008 appointed 18 new partners. In 2018, the practice appointed an additional 13 partners. As of 2019, it had 87 partners and over 2,500 employees.

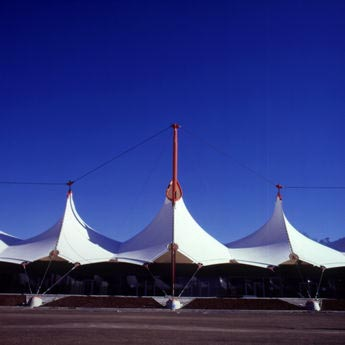
Ashford Designer Outlet in Kent, United Kingdom

== Projects ==
=== Lightweight structures ===
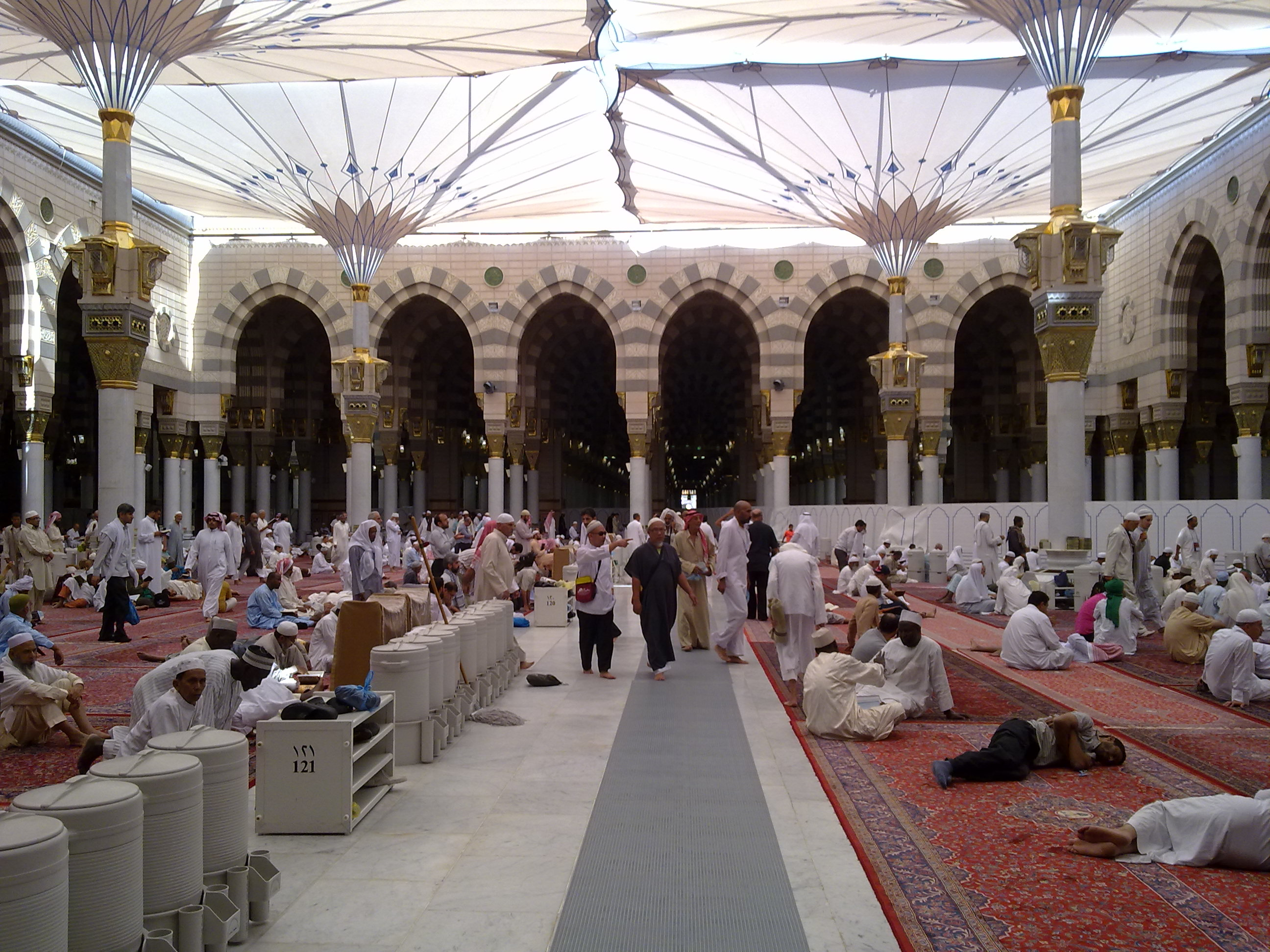
Umbrella-like shading canopies inside the Masjid an-Nabawi (Mosque of the Prophet)

In 1973, before the founding of Buro Happold, Edmund Happold, Ian Liddell, Vera Straka, Peter Rice and Michael Dickson established a lightweight structures research laboratory corresponding to Frei Otto's similar research institute at the university of Stuttgart. Ted Happold was the first to introduce ethylenetetrafluoroethylene (ETFE) as a cladding material, and the outcomes of the research carried out by the laboratory led to the development of the designs for the Mannheim Multihall gridshell and a number of landmark fabric structures in the Middle East and the UK, allowing the new building forms to become generally accepted by architects and clients.

Buro Happold's early projects included designing giant fabric umbrellas for Pink Floyd concerts, the Munich Aviary and the Mannheim Multihalle, both with Frei Otto, an architect who repeatedly worked with Buro Happold on projects which pioneered lightweight structures. The Mannheim Multihalle was a timber gridshell of 50 mm × 50 mm (2.0 by 2.0 inches) lathes of hemlock of irregular form, depending on the elasticity of spring washers at the joints for its flexible form. It was one of the first major uses of structural gridshells.

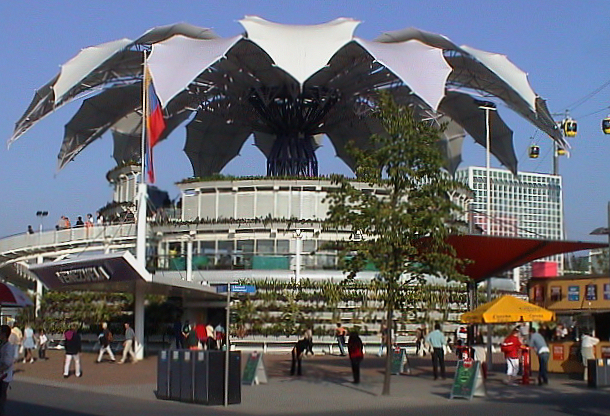
The Venezuela Pavilion at Expo 2000 in Hanover, consisting of fabric 'petals' which could open and close according to weather conditions

Following the development of fabric structures expertise on the projects with Frei Otto, Buro Happold was instrumental in further developing the knowledge and technology of fabric structures. With Bodo Rasch, a protégé of Frei Otto, and drawing on experience from the Pink Floyd canopies, they designed folding, umbrella-like canopies to shade the courtyard of Al-Masjid al-Nabawi (The Mosque of the Prophet) in Medina, Saudi Arabia. They also designed the, at the time, largest fabric canopy in Europe at the Ashford Designer Outlet in the UK.

This development of fabric structures expertise culminated in Buro Happold, with a team led by Ian Liddell, and with Paul Westbury, designing the Millennium Dome, the world's largest fabric roof and the first building of its type. The expertise in wooden gridshell structures has resulted in the design of structures such as the Weald and Downland Museum and the Savill Building in Windsor Great Park.

Buro Happold has also completed the designs of a number of cardboard structures, notably the Japan Pavilion for Expo 2000 in Hanover with Shigeru Ban and Frei Otto, consisting of a gridshell of paper tubes (the structure was reinforced with steel in order to comply with fire regulations, though the tubular structure was itself structurally sufficient). The firm has worked with Shigeru Ban on a number of other projects. Another design in cardboard was the Westborough School cardboard classroom in Westcliff.

=== Notable projects in the UK ===
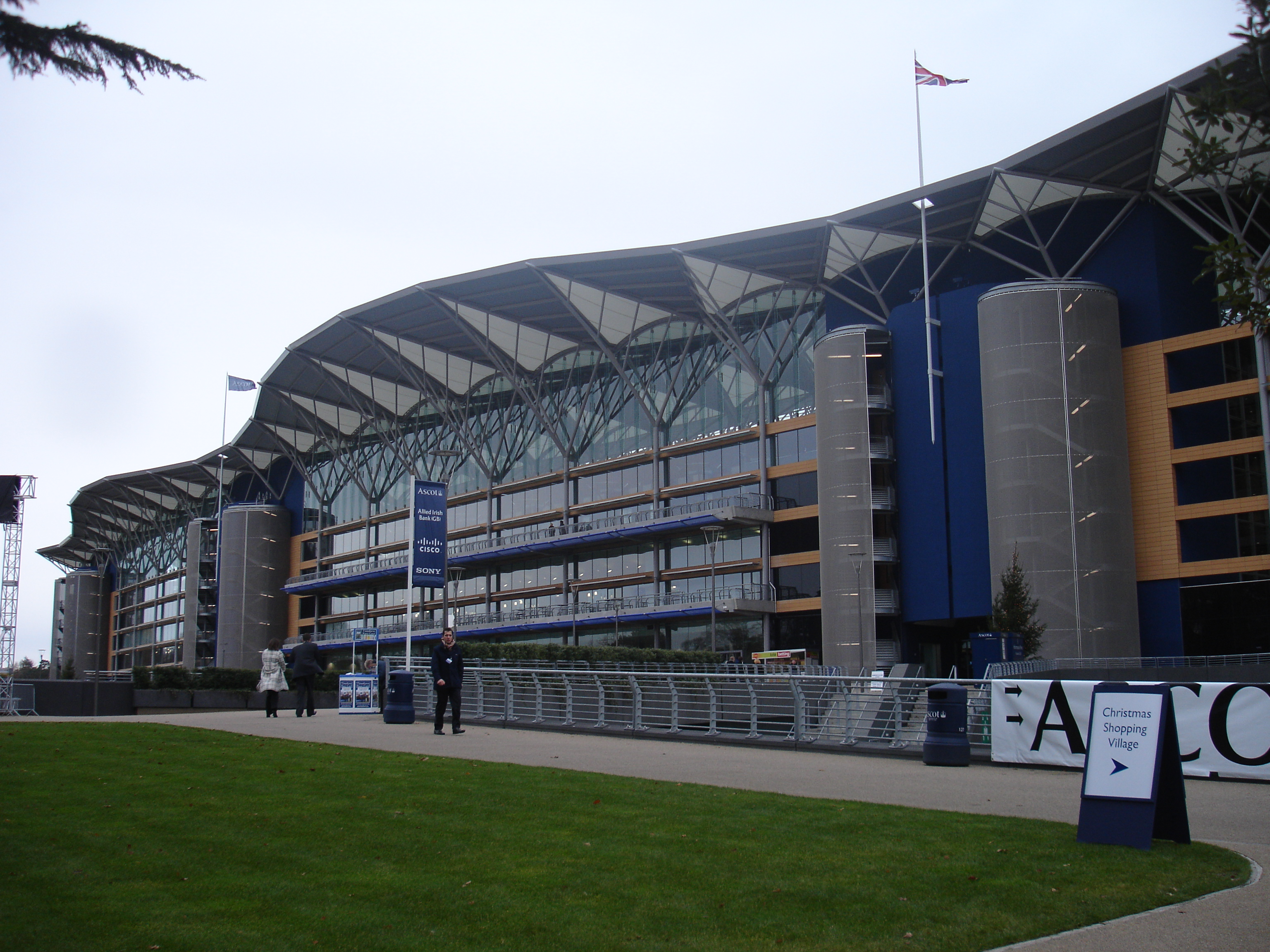
Ascot racecourse stand

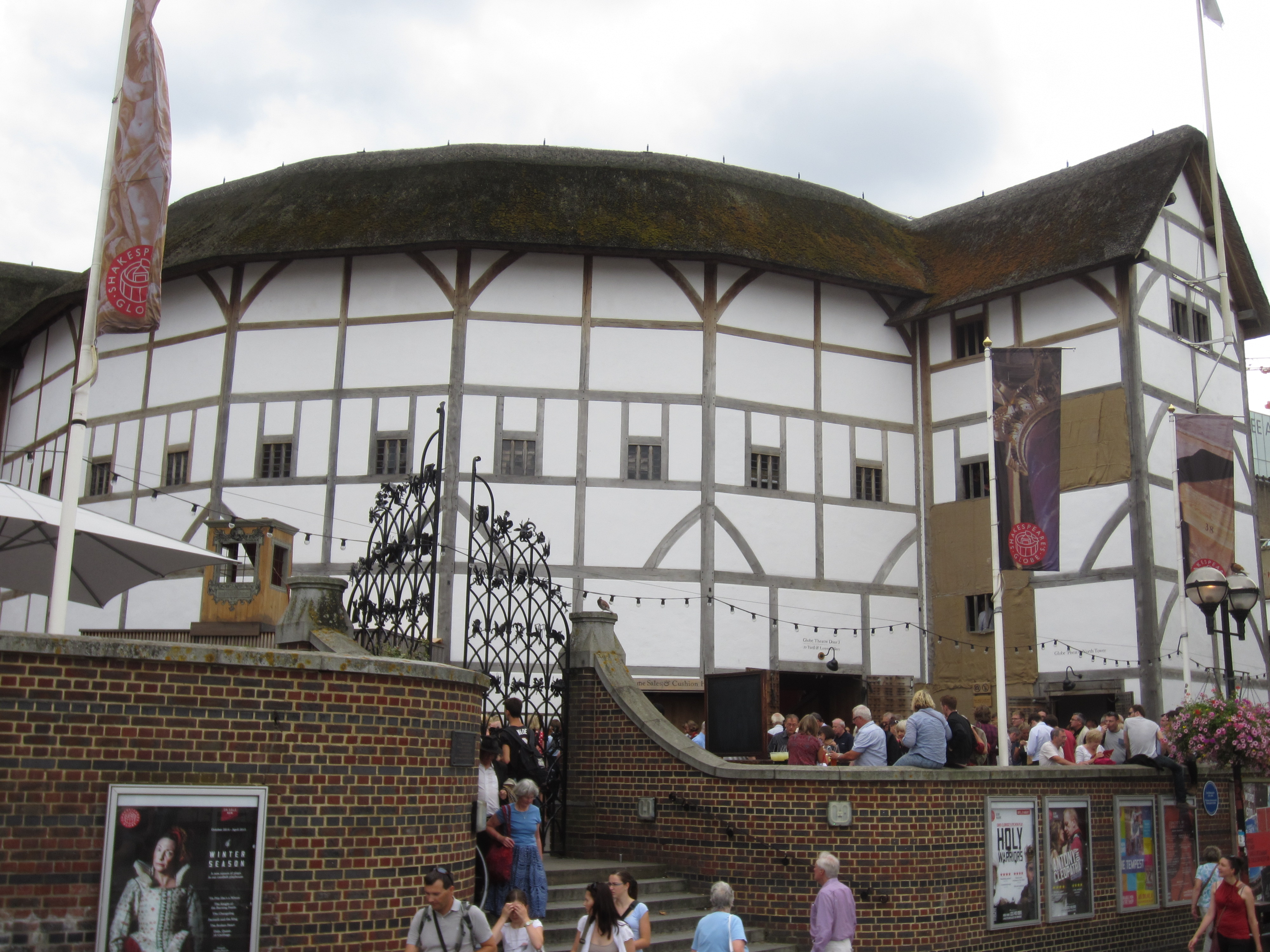
Globe Theatre

==== UK completed projects ====
- One Angel Square in Manchester
- Arsenal F.C.'s Emirates Stadium in London
- Ascot Racecourse in Ascot
- The O2 Arena
- The Weald and Downland Gridshell
- Perth Concert Hall in Perth, Scotland
- The Savill Building in Windsor Great Park
- The British Museum Queen Elizabeth II Great Court Roof in London
- The Lowry Centre in Salford
- The Sackler Crossing in Kew Gardens, London
- Sheffield Winter Gardens in Sheffield
- The Eden Project Core in Cornwall
- The Globe Theatre in London
- Wales Institute for Sustainable Education (at the Centre for Alternative Technology), Machynlleth, Wales; a new education and visitor centre.
- Riverside Museum in Glasgow, Scotland
- Tottenham Hotspur Stadium
- Battersea Power Station Redevelopment

==== UK projects in progress ====
- Everton Stadium in Bramley-Moore Dock, Vauxhall, Liverpool
- Redevelopment of the Kop stand at Wrexham A.F.C.'s Racecourse Ground

=== Notable international projects ===
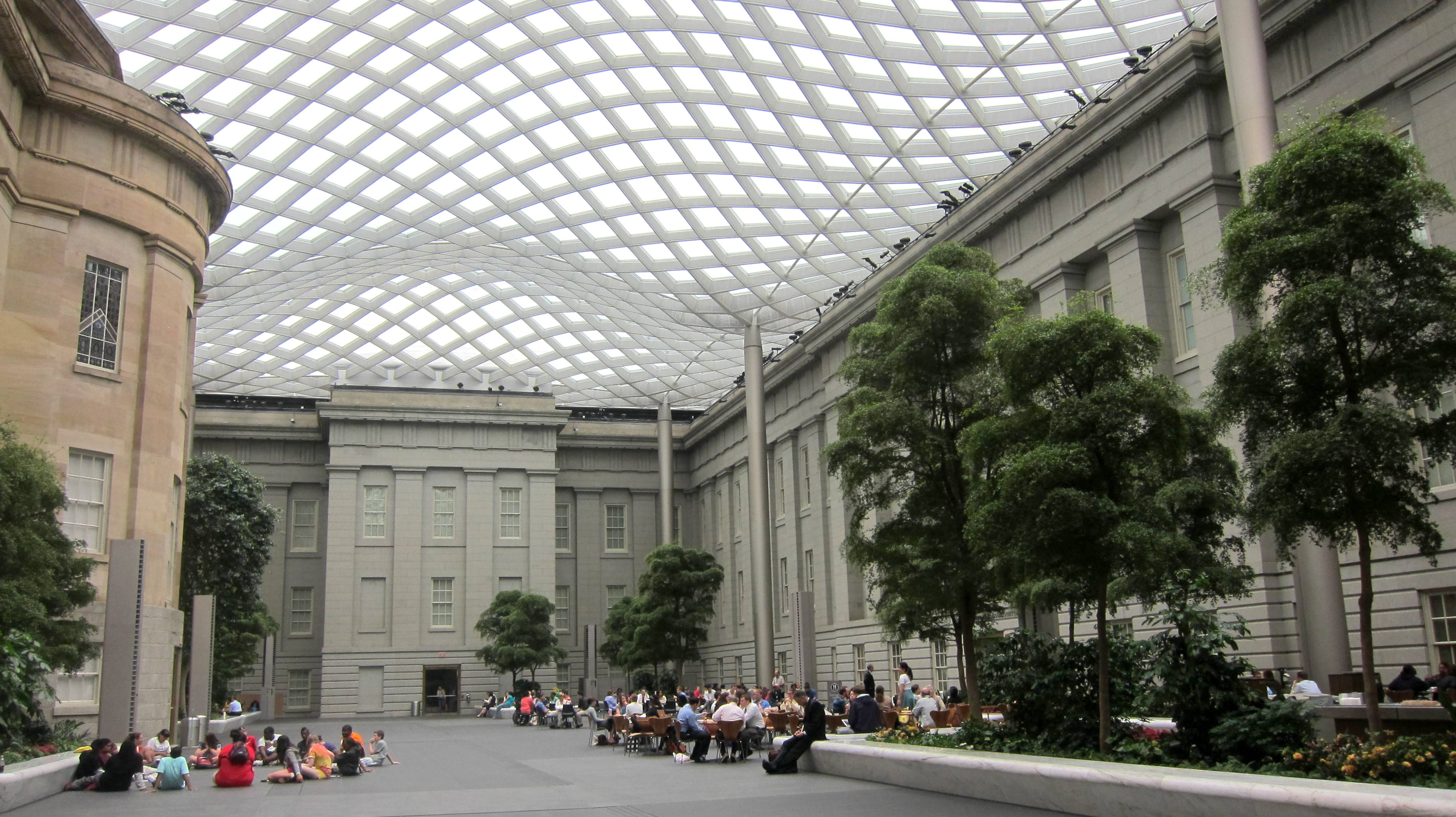
Old Patent Office Building roof for the Smithsonian American Art Museum

==== International completed projects ====
- The Al Faisaliah Centre in Riyadh, Saudi Arabia
- The Memorial to the Murdered Jews of Europe in Berlin
- The Genzyme Headquarters in Cambridge, Massachusetts, United States
- The Danish National Opera House in Copenhagen, Denmark
- The Palace of Peace and Reconciliation in Kazakhstan
- Dresden Hauptbahnhof redevelopment, in Dresden, Germany
- The Smithsonian American Art Museum's Robert and Arlene Kogod Courtyard's new roof in Washington, D.C., United States (the Old Patent Office Building); a curved steel grid roof clad in square glass overlapping panels.
- Aviva Stadium (formerly Lansdowne Road Stadium) in Dublin, Ireland; a four-tiered, 50,000 seater national football and rugby stadium with a freeform transparent facade.
- Hawaii Preparatory Academy Energy Lab, one of the first buildings in the world to be certified a Living Building in the Living Building Challenge.
- Philippine Arena, in the Philippines is the largest indoor arena in the world in terms of seating capacity. It can hold up to 60,000 seats(max).
- The Anaheim Regional Transportation Intermodal Center, a rail and bus transportation hub in Anaheim, California.
- Museum of the Future in Dubai a 7 storey torus-shaped museum dedicated to exploring the future of science, technology, and innovation.
- Louvre Abu Dhabi, an innovative art museum set beneath a 180-meter steel dome.
- Mercedes-Benz Stadium a 75,000 capacity retractable roof multi-purpose stadium in Atlanta
- Lille Langebro a walking and cycling bridge across the Inner Harbour in Copenhagen, Denmark.

==== International projects in progress ====
- Stuttgart Hauptbahnhof redevelopment (Stuttgart 21), in Stuttgart, Germany; a project to realign the Deutsche Bahn's rail lines so they can be joined to the intra-European network. The sub-terranean station will be roofed with a public park, with organically shaped, reinforced concrete shells with petal-shaped sections terminating as skylights. The project is due for completion in 2013.
- Grand Egyptian Museum, Cairo, Egypt; the design of building services for a new museum adjacent to the Pyramids in Egypt, to house the world's largest collection of ancient Egyptian antiquities.
- The Salesforce Transit Center, a transportation complex in San Francisco

=== Other significant activities ===
Buro Happold mainly provides engineering services for buildings, but also undertakes a proportion of its work in civil, geotechnical and environmental engineering, and an increasing amount of overseas development work.

Buro Happold is part of the consortium appointed by EDAW to design the Olympic Park for the London 2012 Olympics. The team which built the Emirates Stadium, made up of McAlpine, Populous and Buro Happold also designed and constructed the Olympic Stadium.

In 2021, Buro Happold acquired Vanguardia Consulting, an acoustic and audio-visual consultancy firm, to strengthen their offering in these areas. The acquisition included Crowd Dynamics, Vanguardia's sister company.

== Awards ==
=== Notable awards ===
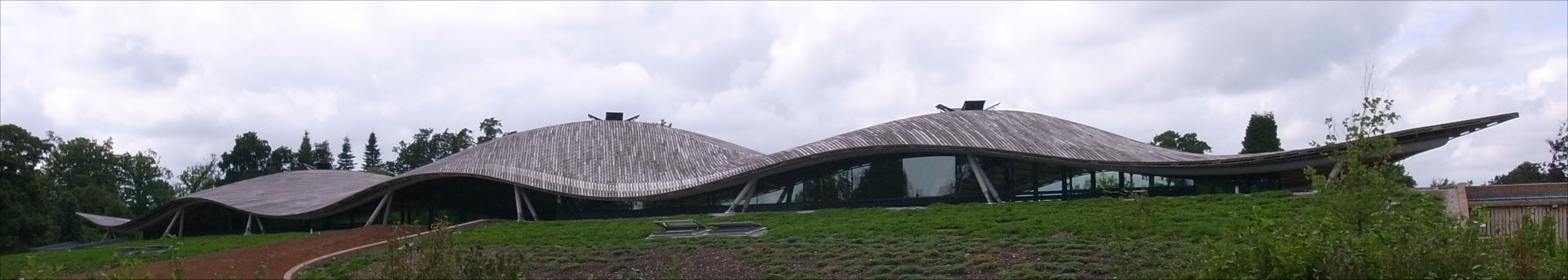
The Savill Building, a visitor centre at Windsor Great Park

Buro Happold's most recent awards include: ‘Building performance consultancy (over 1000 employees)’ and the 'Energy Efficient Product or Innovation' Award for NewMass, a phase change chilled beam at the 2018 CIBSE Building Performance Awards.

Buro Happold won the Aga Khan Award for Architecture for Tuwaiq Palace in Riyadh in 1998 and again in 2010 for the design of the Wadi Hanifah wetlands. Buro Happold also won the Queen's Award for Enterprise twice, for export achievement and again for sustainable development. In 1999 Buro Happold engineers Ian Liddell, Paul Westbury, Dawood Pandor and technician Gary Dagger won the Royal Academy of Engineering's MacRobert Award for their design of the Millennium Dome – only the second time in the award's history that it has gone to a construction project. Buro Happold received the accompanying gold medal.

In 2007, Buro Happold won the IStructE Supreme Award for the Savill Building in Windsor Great Park.

The Aviva Stadium won the 2011 International Project Award at the British Construction Industry Awards. The Royal Shakespeare Theatre won the Project of the Year Award at the 2011 Building Awards. At the 2010 Structural Awards the John Hope Gateway building won the award for Arts or Entertainment Structures. The Institution of Structural Engineers announced there were to be two winners of its coveted Gold Medal in 2012: Buro Happold's then-CEO Paul Westbury was one of them. Paul was selected for the award due to his innovation in the structural form, and design of sports and entertainment buildings; in particular for his leading contribution to the design and construction of Arsenal's Emirates Stadium in London, the 2006 Olympic Speed Skating Oval in Turin, Dublin's Aviva Stadium and the London 2012 Olympic Stadium.

=== Stirling Prize winning projects ===
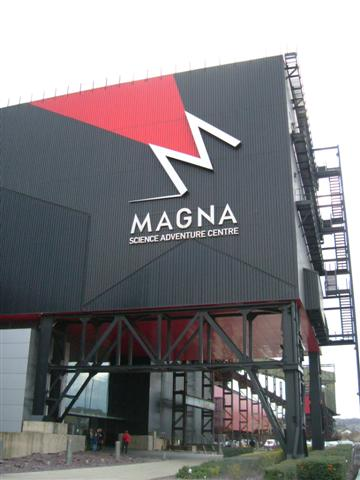
The Magna Science Adventure Centre, Rotherham

Buro Happold's projects have won three RIBA Stirling Prizes: the Media Centre at Lord's Cricket Ground in 1999, the Magna Science Adventure Centre in Rotherham in 2001 and Burntwood School in 2015. The Library of Birmingham won the public vote for the Stirling Prize in 2014 and the Evelina Children's Hospital won the public vote in 2006. The following Buro Happold projects have been shortlisted for the Stirling Prize:

- The Library of Birmingham in 2014
- The Royal Shakespeare Theatre redevelopment in 2011
- The renovation of Dresden Main Station in 2007
- The Savill Building in Windsor Great Park in 2007.
- Evelina Children's Hospital in 2006
- The Business Academy, Bexley in 2004
- The Queen Elizabeth II Great Court in 2003
- The Weald and Downland Gridshell in 2002
