= Savill Building =

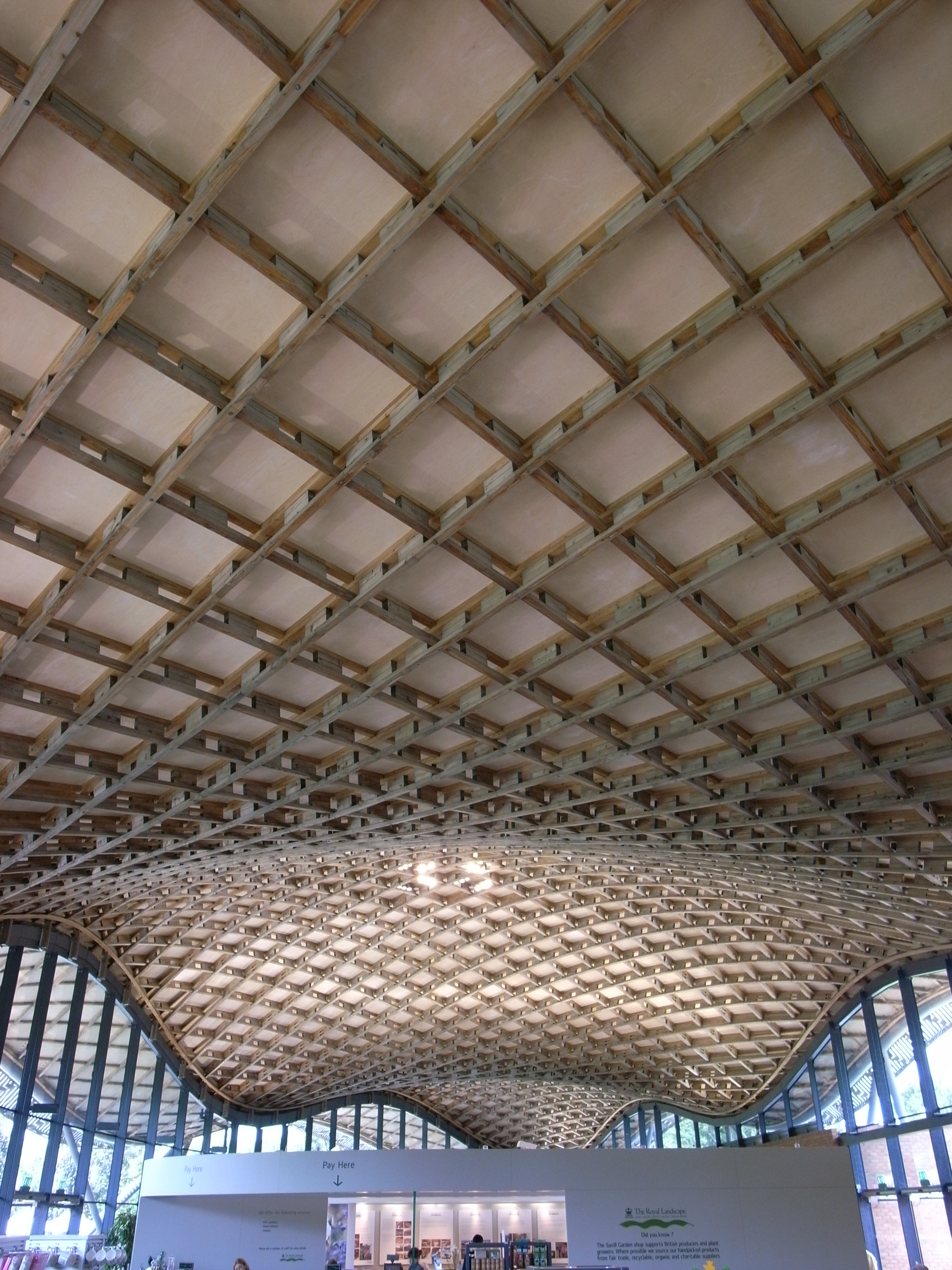

General information
- Type: Visitor Centre / Pavilion
- Location: Windsor, England
- Coordinates: 51.4271°N 0.5966°W
- Completed: 2006

Technical details
- Structural system: Timber gridshell

Design and construction
- Architect: Glen Howells Architects
- Structural engineer: Buro Happold & Engineers Haskins Robinson Waters
- Services engineer: Buro Happold
- Main contractor: Green Oak Carpentry Company

The Savill Building is a visitor centre at the entrance to the Savill Garden in Windsor Great Park, Surrey, England designed by Glen Howells Architects, Buro Happold and Engineers Haskins Robinson Waters. It was opened by the Duke of Edinburgh on 26 June 2006.

== Building ==
The building is located on the space of a mature beech tree plantation which was severely damaged in the hurricane of 1987. All remaining mature trees were retained in the scheme. The Stirling Prize judges describe it as:

"This project is a good modern interpretation of that great British traditional form: the Pavilion in the Park."

=== Gridshell roof ===
The roof is the dominant feature of the building:

"So what you have is effectively a great big weather-sealed canopy, perched on dynamically angled steel legs. It is the ultimate summerhouse, the granddaddy of gazebos."

Hugh Pearman

The building has a 'three-domed' sinusoidal-shaped gridshell roof of two layers of interlocking larch laths (50 × 80 mm) on a one-metre square grid, supported on steel quadropods and a steel tubular ring-beam. The exact form of the roof was designed by Buro Happold to be the most structurally efficient possible using specialist in-house software (Tensyl). The roof is clad in plywood panels, with aluminium weather proofing and a top cladding of oak. All timber was harvested from the nearby Crown Estate. The roof is over 90 m in length and up to 25 m wide, and because of its own separate structural system appears to hover over the brick and glass facade of the building.

The carpentry, which used over 400 larch trees and 20 carpenters, was done by the Green Oak Carpentry Company.

=== Exterior ===
The roof structure remains exposed from the inside, and is a notable feature of the building. The entrance facade is covered by an extensive green roof, which is planted with Microbiota decussata and Juniperus squamata. The exterior cladding of the building is a full-height glass curtain walling system, providing views from inside and creating an unusual lighting effect in the dark.

=== Interior ===
The building, which is partially below ground level, contains a shop, seminar rooms, offices, planteria (small garden centre) and restaurant, with a raised terrace along one edge allowing views over the gardens from the centre's interior spaces. Below the entrance there is a basement housing service spaces including the kitchen, storerooms and washrooms.

The large main internal space is subdivided by Corian 'pods' which are separate from the main building structure.

== Awards ==
The building was shortlisted for the 2007 Stirling Prize.

The structural design won the IStructE Structural Awards Supreme Award for Structural Engineering Excellence in 2007, in addition to the Award for Arts, Leisure or Entertainment Structures.

At the 2007 RIBA Awards it also won a RIBA Award and a RIBA National Award.

At the 2007 Wood Awards it won, a Gold Award, a Commercial and Public Access Award, and Structural Award.

== Gallery ==
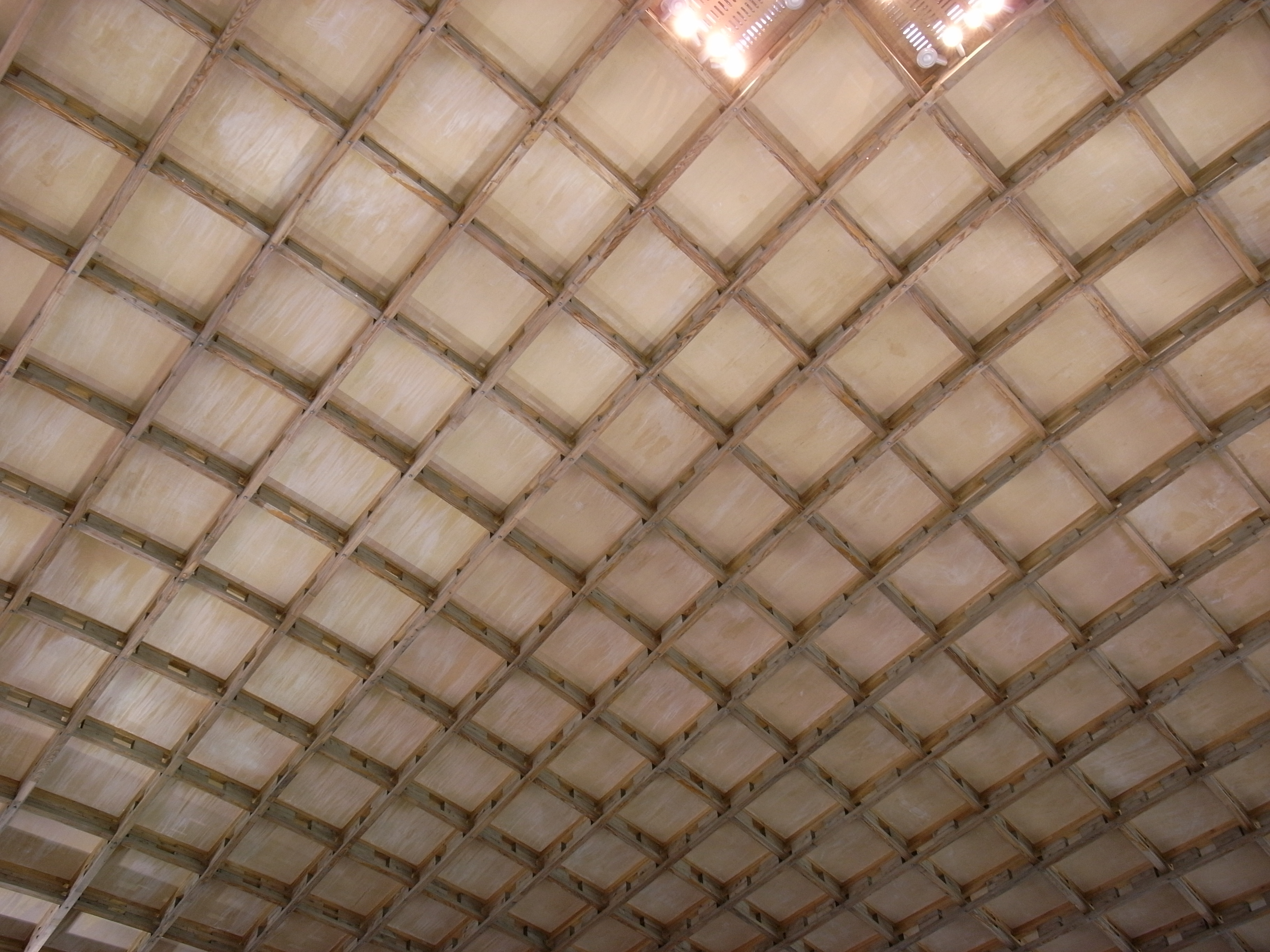
Interior of wooden gridshell roof

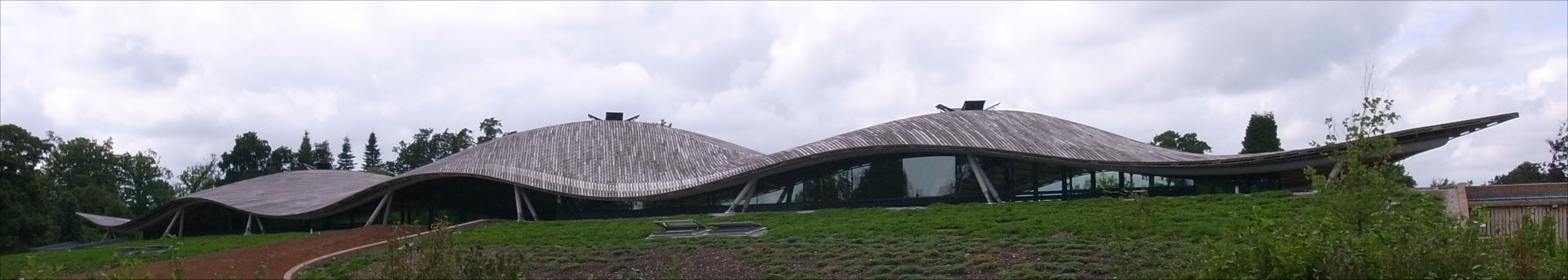
Front view

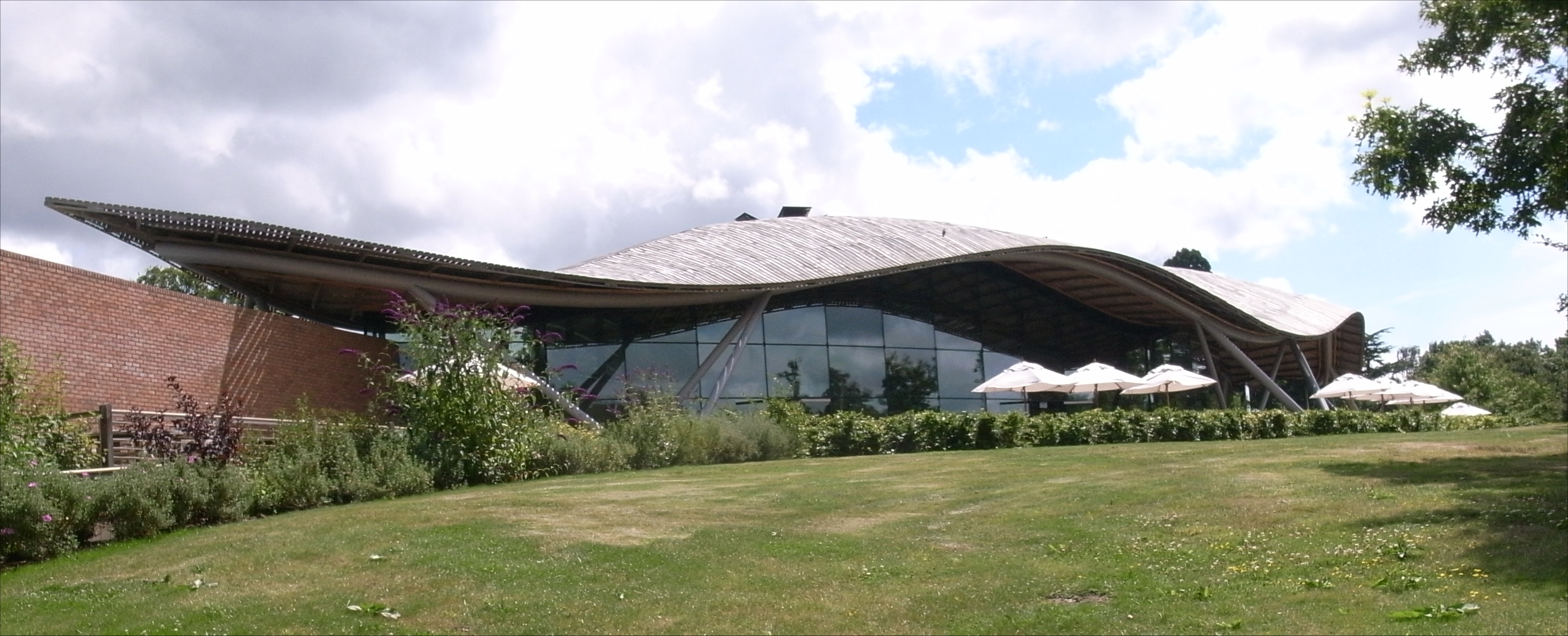
Rear view (from garden)
