= Frei Otto =

German architect (1925–2015)

- Born: Frei Paul Otto; 31 May 1925; Siegmar, Saxony, Germany
- Died: 9 March 2015 (aged 89); Leonberg, Baden-Württemberg, Germany
- Occupation: Architect

Frei Paul Otto (German: [fʁaɪ ˈʔɔtoː]; 31 May 1925 – 9 March 2015) was a German architect and structural engineer noted for his use of lightweight structures, in particular tensile and membrane structures, including the roof of the Olympic Stadium in Munich for the 1972 Summer Olympics.

Otto won the RIBA Royal Gold Medal in 2006 and was awarded the Pritzker Architecture Prize in 2015, shortly before his death.

== Early life ==
Otto was born in Siegmar, Germany, and grew up in Berlin. He studied architecture in Berlin before being drafted into the Luftwaffe as a fighter pilot in the last years of World War II. He was interned in a prisoner of war camp near Chartres (France) and with his aviation engineering training and lack of material and an urgent need for housing, began experimenting with tents for shelter. After the war he studied briefly in the US and visited Erich Mendelsohn, Mies van der Rohe, Richard Neutra, and Frank Lloyd Wright.

== Career ==
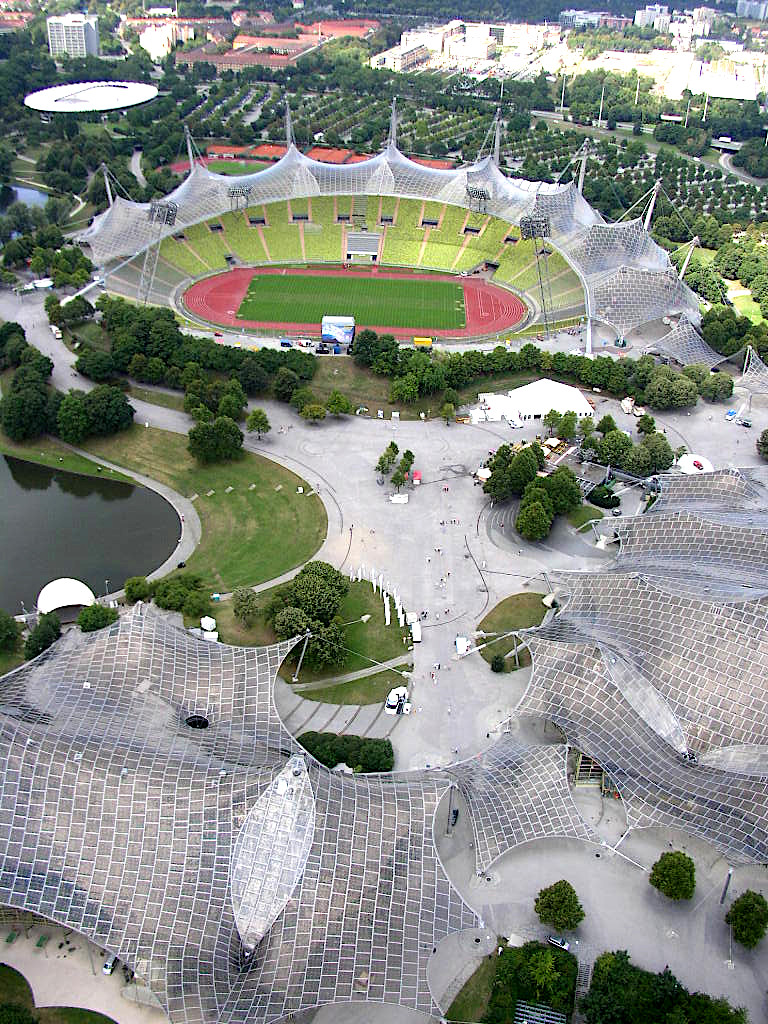
1972 Munich Olympic Stadium

Otto began a private practice in Germany in 1952. He earned a doctorate in tensioned constructions in 1954. His saddle-shaped cable-net music pavilion at the Bundesgartenschau (Federal Garden Exposition) in Kassel 1955 brought him his first significant attention.

Otto specialised in lightweight tensile and membrane structures, and pioneered advances in structural mathematics and civil engineering. In 1958, Otto taught at Washington University in St. Louis' Sam Fox School of Design & Visual Arts where he met Buckminster Fuller. Otto founded the Institute for Lightweight Structures at the university of Stuttgart in 1964 and headed the institute until his retirement as university professor. Major works include the West German Pavilion designed together with Rolf Gutbrod for the Montreal Expo in 1967. Otto subsequently designed the roof of the 1972 Munich Olympic Arena. He lectured worldwide and taught at the Architectural Association School of Architecture, where he also designed some of the research facilities buildings of the school's forest campus in Hooke Park.

Until his death, Otto remained active as an architect and engineer, and as consultant to his protégé Mahmoud Bodo Rasch for a number of projects in the Middle East. One of his more recent projects was his work with Shigeru Ban on the Japanese Pavilion at Expo 2000 with a roof structure made entirely of paper, and together with SL Rasch GmbH Special and Lightweight Structures he designed a convertible roof for the Venezuelan Pavilion. In an effort to memorialise the September 11 attacks and its victims as early as 2002, Otto envisioned the two footprints of the World Trade Center buildings covered with water and surrounded by trees; his plan includes a world map embedded in the park with countries at war marked with lights and a continuously updated board announcing the number of people killed in war from 11 September 2001, onward.

On request of Christoph Ingenhoven, Otto was consultant for special construction for the design of the "Light eyes" for Stuttgart 21. – drop-shaped overlights in the park, that descend onto the tracks to support the ceiling. Otto remarked in 2010 that the construction should be stopped because of the difficult geology.

Otto died on 9 March 2015; he was to be publicly announced as the winner of the 2015 Pritzker Prize on 23 March but his death meant the committee announced his award on 10 March. Otto himself had been told earlier that he had won the prize by the executive director of the Pritzker Prize, Martha Thorne. He was reported to have said, "I've never done anything to gain this prize. Prize winning is not the goal of my life. I try to help poor people, but what shall I say here — I'm very happy."

== List of buildings ==
This is a partial list of buildings designed by Otto:

- 1957 – Tanzbrunnen pavilion Rheinpark Cologne, Germany
- 1967 – West Germany Pavilion at Expo 67 Montreal, Canada
- 1972 – Roof for Olympic Stadium, Munich, Germany
- 1974 – Convention Center in Mecca, Saudi Arabia
- 1975 – Multihalle, Mannheim, Germany
- 1977 – Umbrellas for 1977 Pink Floyd tour
- 1980 – Aviary at Munich Zoo, Germany
- 1985 – Tuwaiq Palace, Saudi Arabia, with Buro Happold
- 1987–91 – Housing at the International Building Exhibition Berlin, Germany
- 2000 – Roof structure of the Japanese Pavilion at Expo 2000, Hanover Germany (provided engineering assistance with Buro Happold and architectural collaboration with Shigeru Ban)
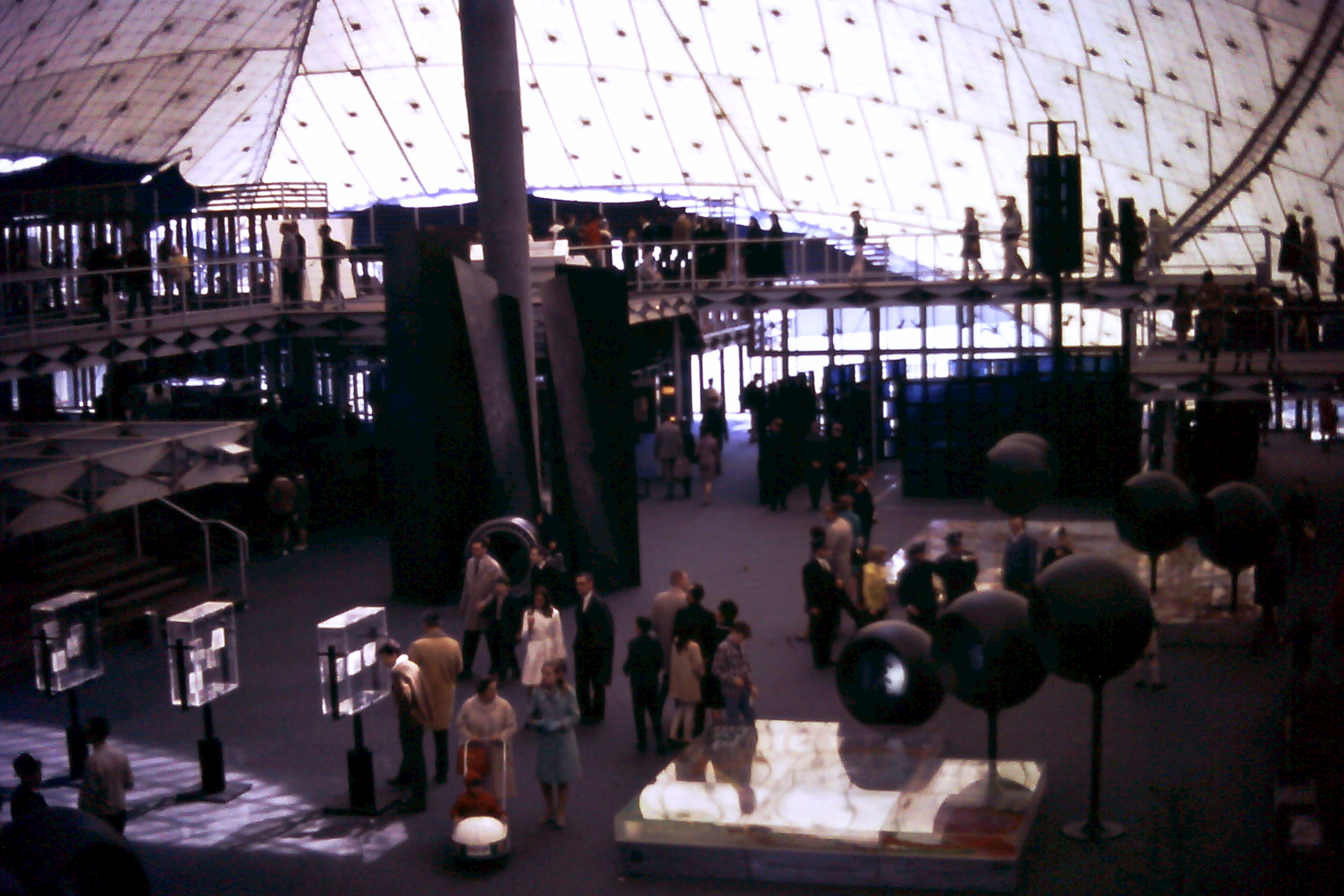
Interior view, West Germany Pavilion, Expo 67, Montreal, Canada

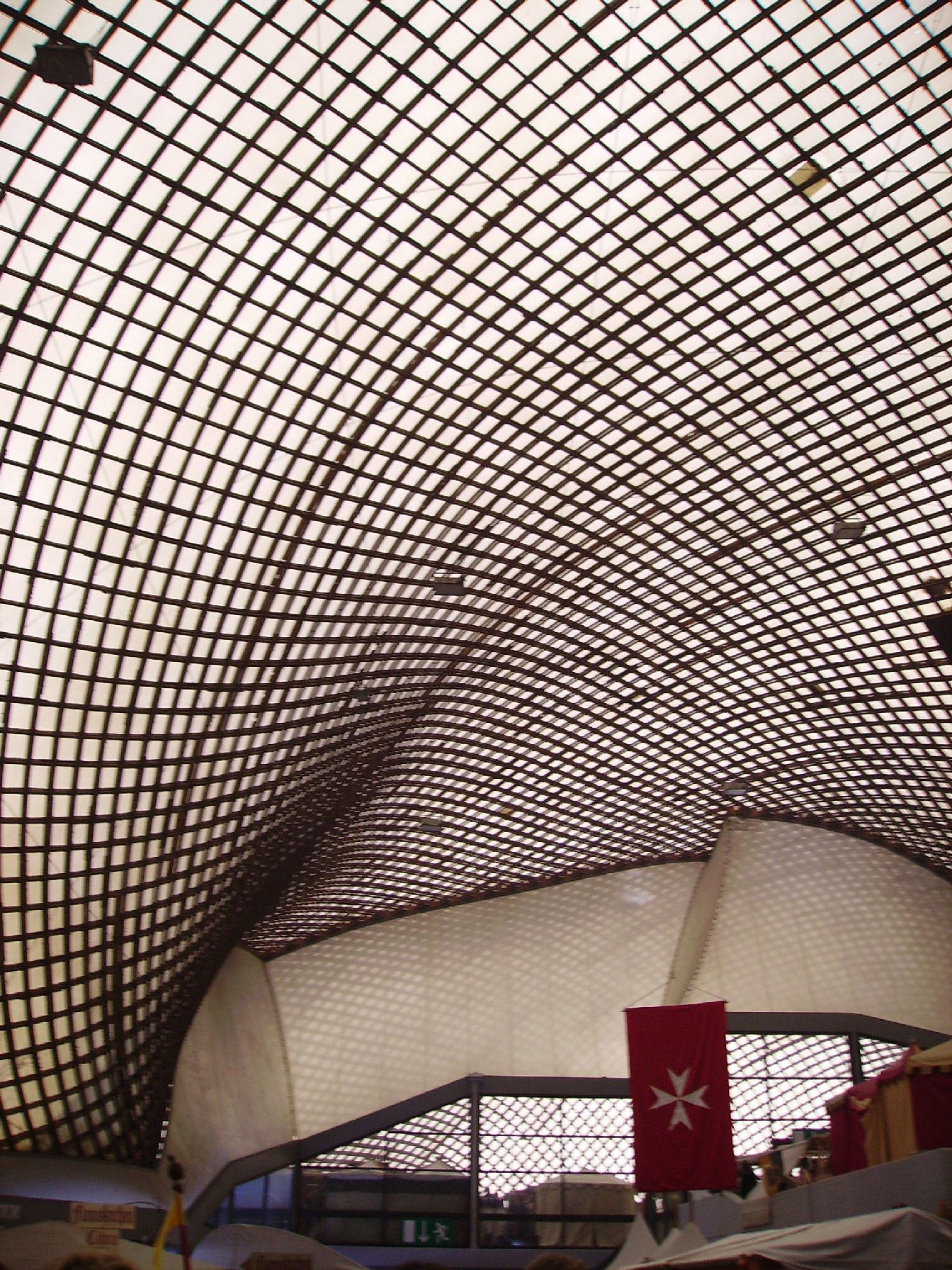
Multihalle in Mannheim

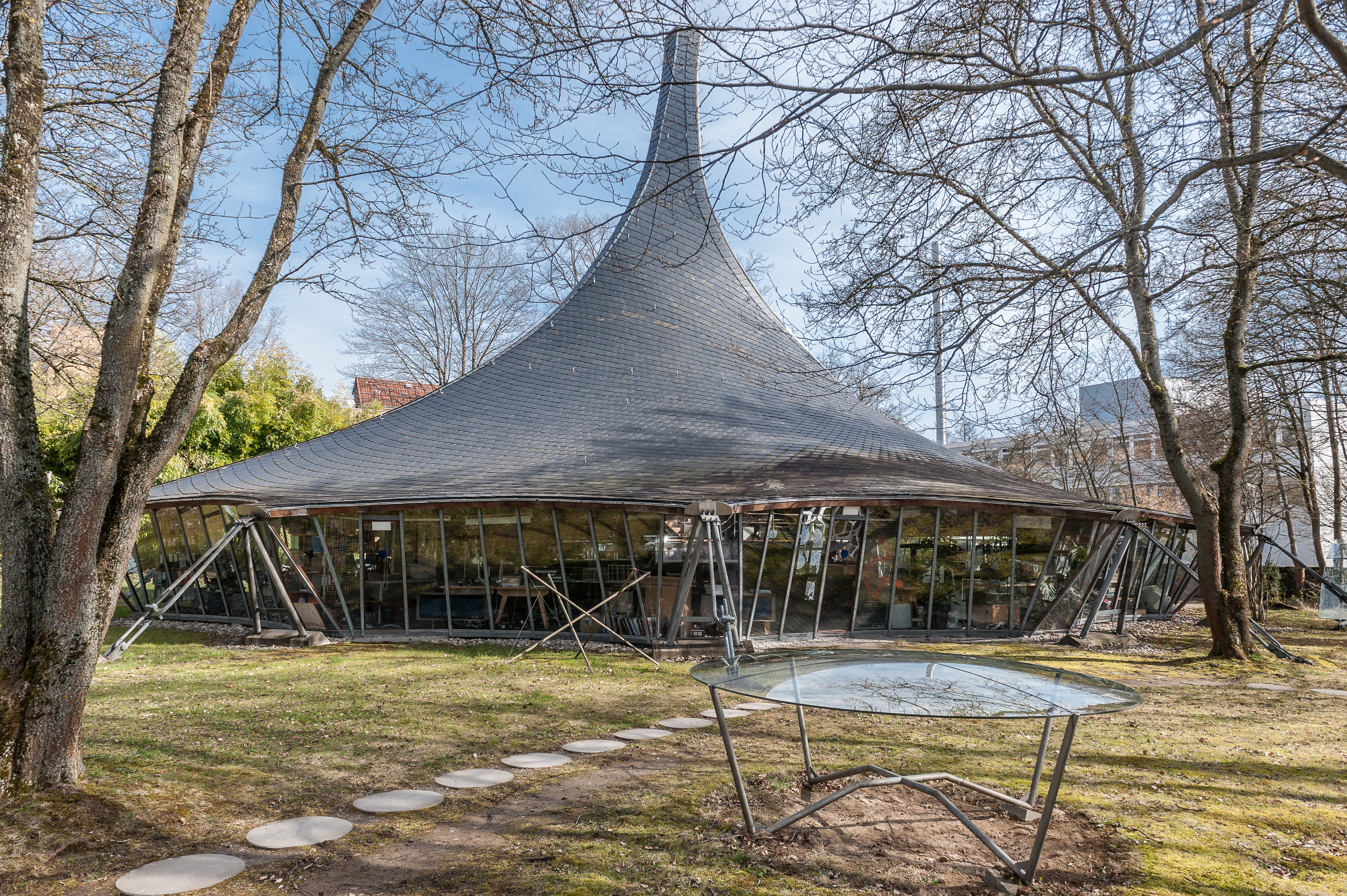
Institut für Leichte Flächentragwerke, University of Stuttgart

== Awards (selected) ==
- 1974 – Thomas Jefferson Medal in Architecture
- 1980 – Honorary doctorate of science from the University of Bath
- 1982 – Großer BDA Preis
- 1996/97 – Wolf Prize in Architecture
- 2005 – Royal Gold Medal for architecture by RIBA
- 2006 – Praemium Imperiale in Architecture
- 2015 – Pritzker Architecture Prize

== See also ==
- Gridshell
