= Gridshell =

Structure deriving strength from a double curvature

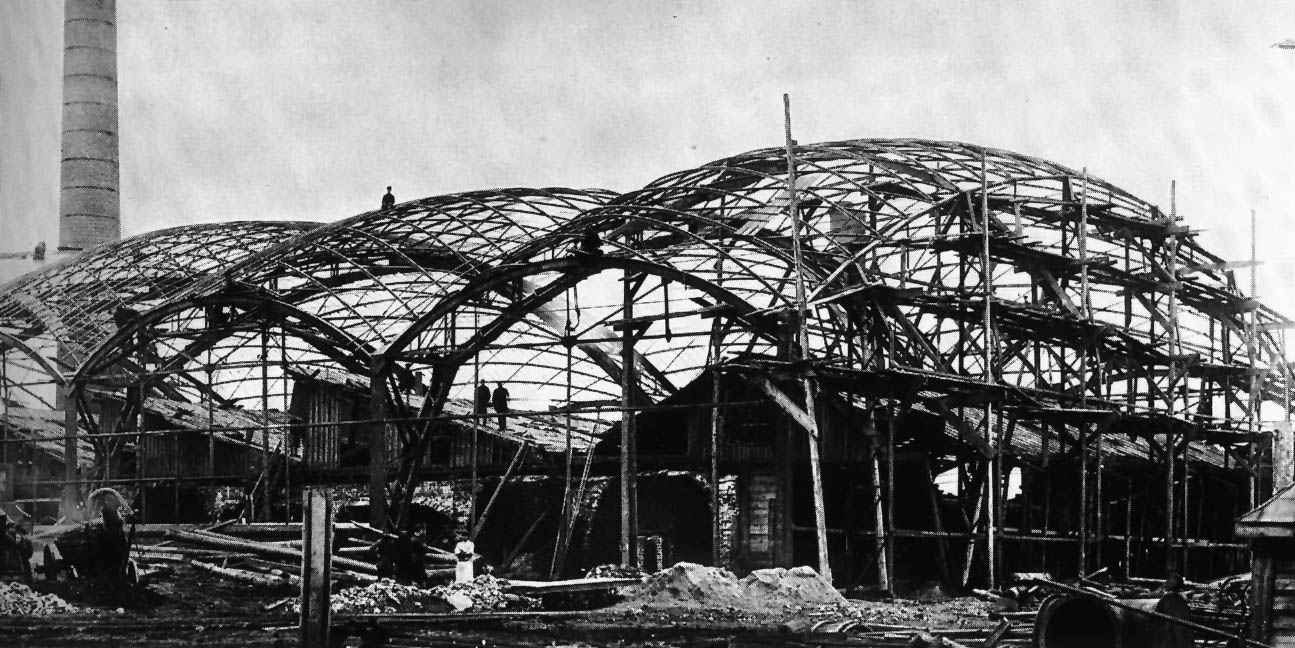
The steel gridshell by Vladimir Shukhov (during construction), Vyksa near Nizhny Novgorod, 1897

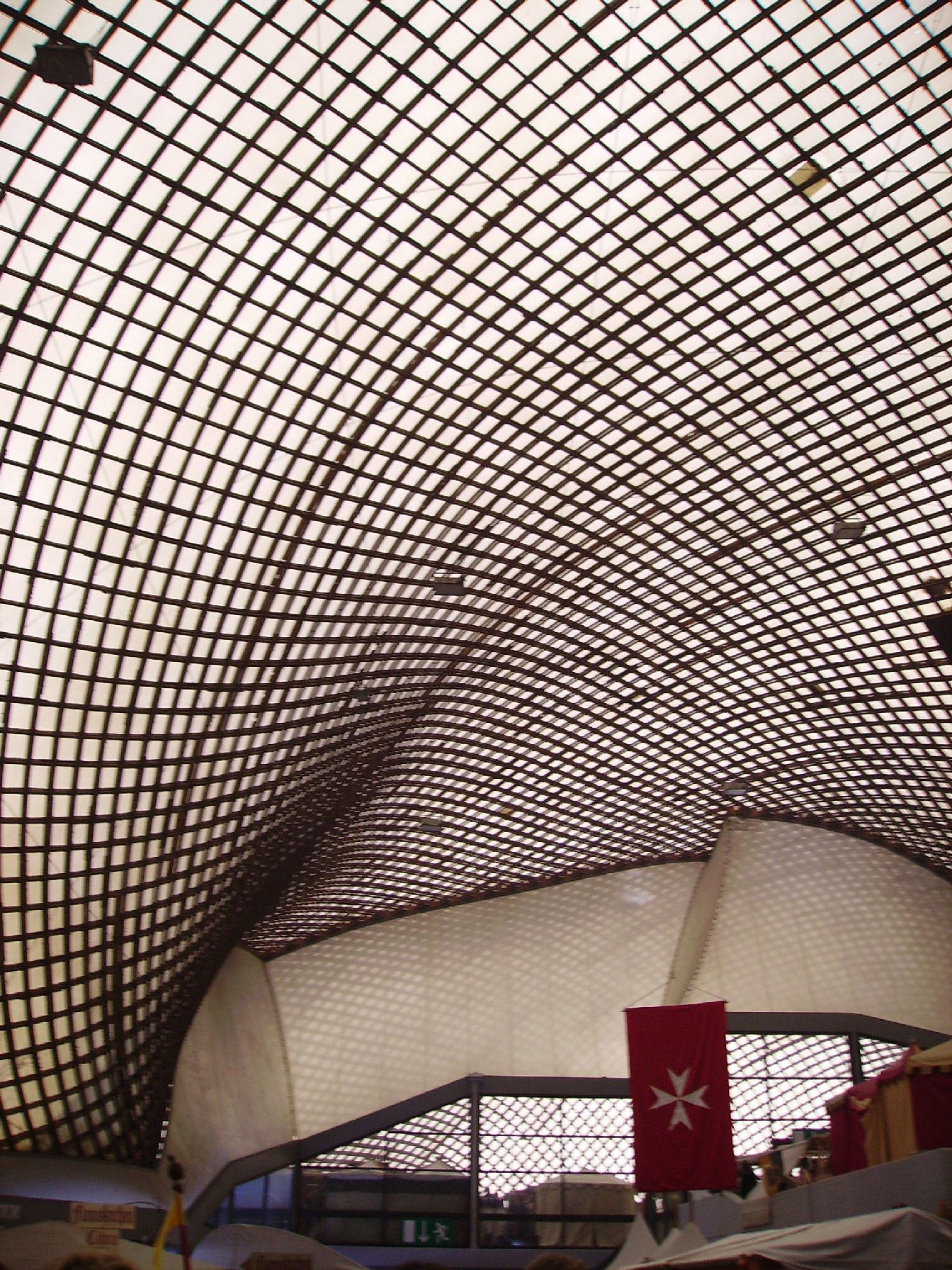
Multihalle in Mannheim, a wooden gridshell structure designed by Frei Otto

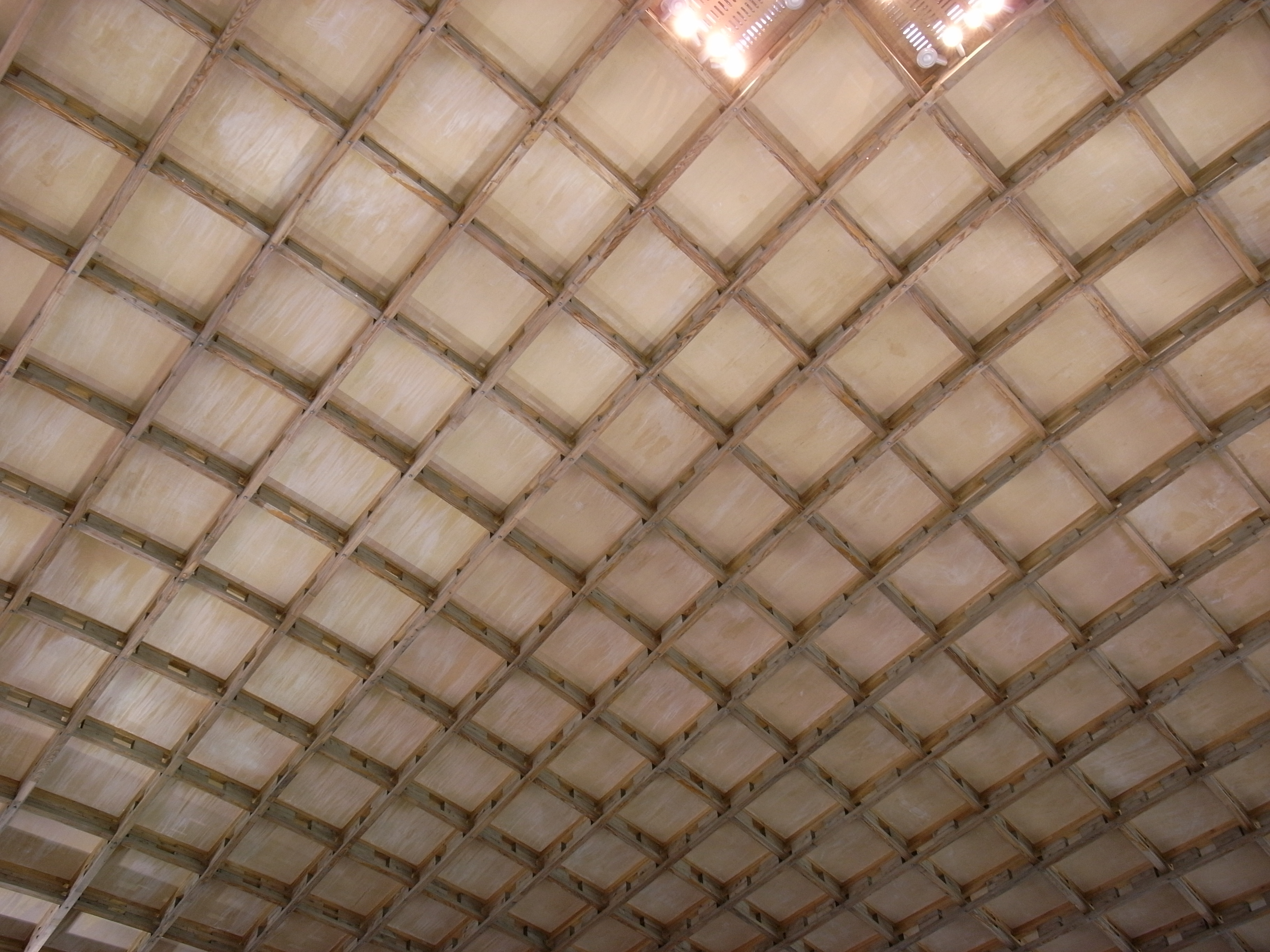
Interior of the gridshell Savill Building

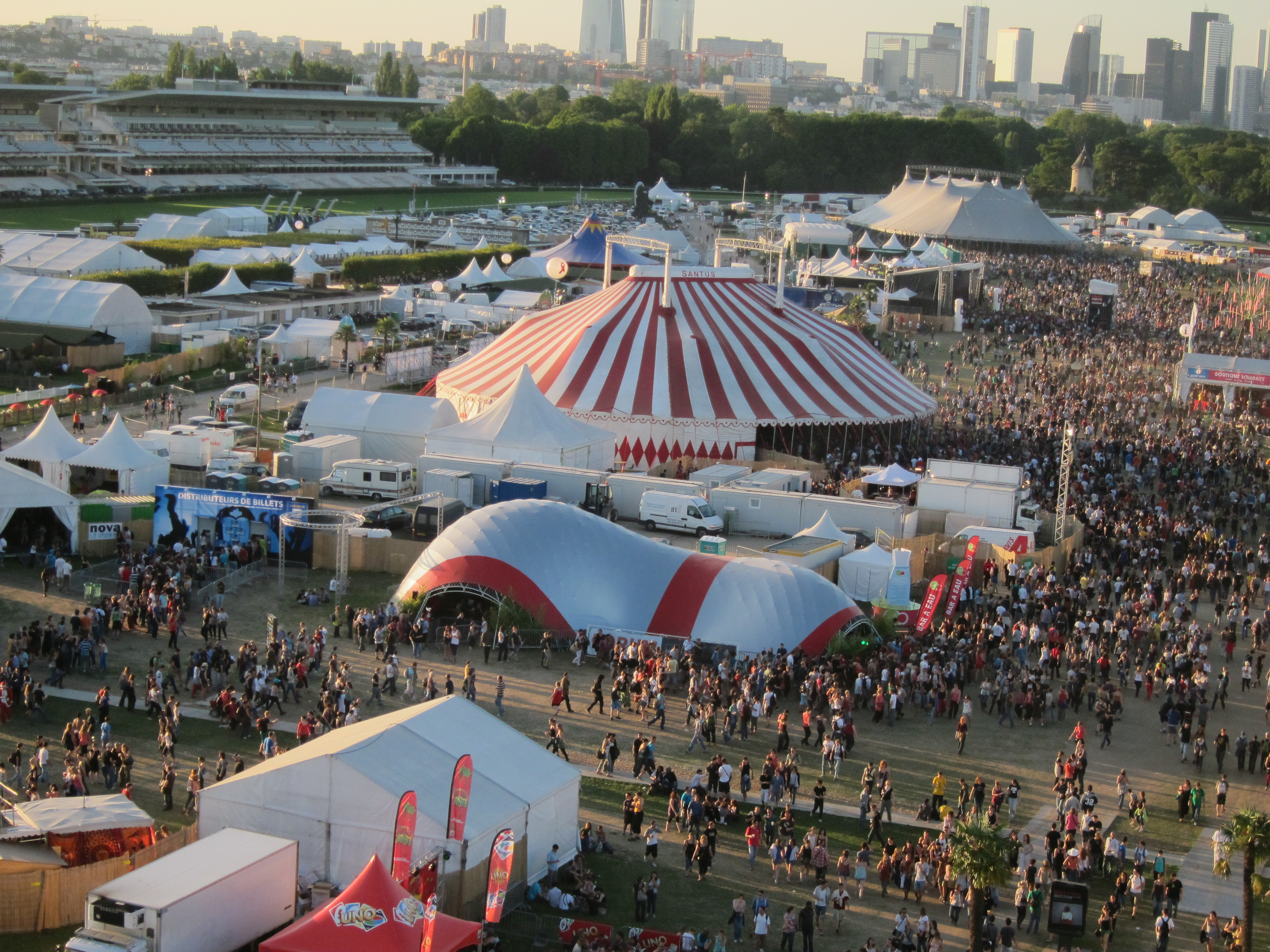
Solidays Forum: a 350 m^{2} glassfibre composite material elastic gridshell, Paris, France, 2011

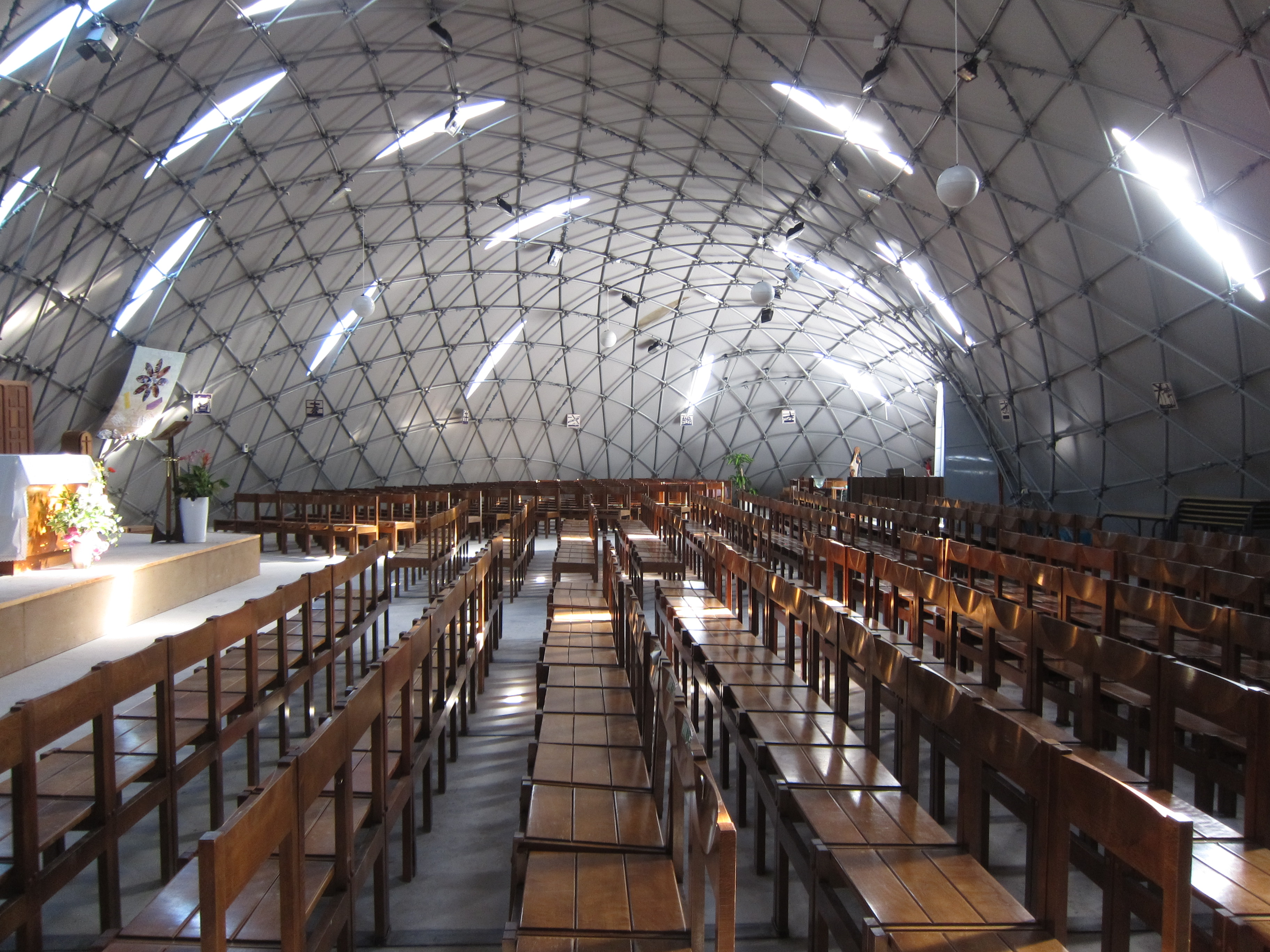
Ephemeral Cathedral: a 400 m^{2} glassfibre composite material elastic gridshell, Créteil, France, 2013

A gridshell is a structure which derives its strength from its double curvature (in a similar way that a fabric structure derives strength from double curvature), but is constructed of a grid or lattice.

The grid can be made of any material, but is most often wood (similar to garden trellis) or steel.

Gridshells were pioneered in the 1896 by Russian engineer Vladimir Shukhov in constructions of exhibition pavilions of the All-Russia industrial and art exhibition 1896 in Nizhny Novgorod.

Large span timber gridshells are commonly constructed by initially laying out the main lath members flat in a regular square or rectangular lattice, and subsequently deforming this into the desired doubly curved form. This can be achieved by pushing the members up from the ground, as in the Mannheim Multihalle. More recent projects such as the Savill Garden gridshell were constructed by laying the laths on top of a sizeable temporary scaffolding structure which is removed in phases to let the laths settle into the desired curvature.

== Gridshell buildings ==
- Shukhov Rotunda by Vladimir Shukhov, 1896
- Mannheim Multihalle by Frei Otto and Arup Structures 3 (many of whose team members later left to found Buro Happold), a very large exhibition space constructed in 1975.
- Japan Pavilion, Expo 2000, by Frei Otto, Buro Happold, Shigeru Ban and SONOCO, a gridshell of circular paper tubes , 2000.
- Flimwell Woodland Enterprise Centre Modular Gridshell by Feilden Clegg and Atelier One, 2000.
- Weald & Downland Open Air Museum by Buro Happold and Edward Cullinan architects, a two-layer wooden gridshell, and the first gridshell constructed in the UK, 2002.
- Pishwanton Hand-Built Gridshell by David Tasker and Christopher Day, 2002.
- Helsinki Zoo viewing platform by Ville Hara, 2003
- Savill Building in Windsor Great Park by Buro Happold and Glenn Howells Architects, a large four-layer wooden gridshell, 2006.
- Courtyard roofing of rural villa, Ostuni, Italy, by cmmkm architettura e design, Roberto Ruggiero, Alfonso Petta, Felice Grasso and Fabio Figlia, 2007.
- Masseria Ospitale's terrace roofing, Lecce, Italy, by cmmkm architettura e design with Bernardino D'Amico and Filomena Nigro, 2010.
- Centre Pompidou-Metz by Shigeru Ban and Arup, 2010.
- Solidays 2011 Gridshell
- Gridshell pavilion for Naples School of Architecture courtyard by Andrea Fiore, Daniele Lancia, Sergio Pone, Sofia Colabella, Bianca Parenti, with Bernardino D'Amico (Structural Consultant) and Francesco Portioli (Structural Consultant), 2012.
- Pavilion in Selinunte’s archeological site by cmmkm architettura e design and arch. Bernardino D’amico, arch. Andrea Fiore and arch. Daniele Lancia, 2012
- SUTD Library Pavilion, Singapore, by SUTD City Form Lab and engineers at ARUP Singapore, 2013.
- Bamboo amphitheater space structure, PUC Rio de Janeiro, by Bambutec, 2014.
- Crossrail Place, London, by Foster + Partners, 2015.
- Wisdome, Stockholm, 2022.

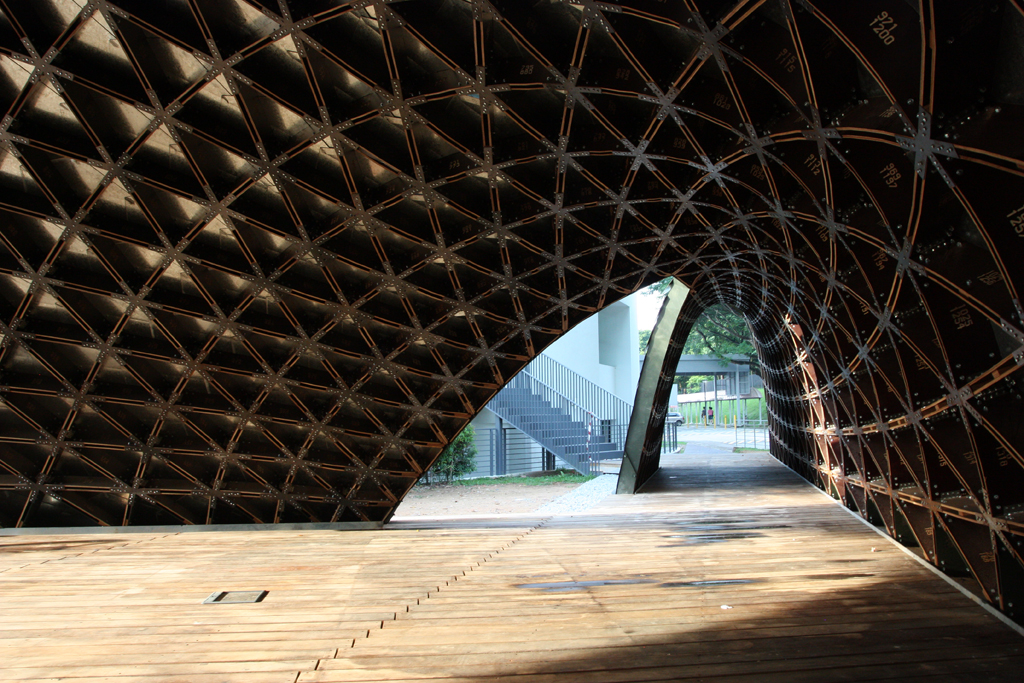
SUTD library pavilion

== See also ==
- Tensile structure
- Stretched grid method
- Thin-shell structure
- Lamella (structure)
- Geodesic dome
- Hyperboloid structure
- Buckminster Fuller
- Norman Foster
