= Fast + Epp =

Structural engineering company

- Type: Private
- Industry: Design, Engineering, Consulting
- Founded: 1985
- Founders: Paul Fast, Gerald Epp
- Headquarters: Vancouver, Canada
- Key people: Paul Fast
- Website: www.fastepp.com

Fast + Epp is an international structural engineering firm headquartered in Vancouver, British Columbia with offices in Edmonton, Calgary, New York, Seattle, and Darmstadt, Germany. The company designed the roof structure for the 2010 Richmond Olympic Oval and is involved in the design of timber and hybrid steel-timber structures.

== Firm History ==
The firm was founded by Paul Fast as Paul Fast Associates Ltd. in 1985. Gerald Epp joined the firm in 1987, and in 1989 the partnership Fast + Epp was formed. In 2010, a branch office was established in Darmstadt, Germany with partner Dr. Jochen Stahl, followed by branch offices in Edmonton, Alberta in 2012, Seattle and New York City in 2016 and Calgary in 2018. In 1997, the partners also established the design-build company StructureCraft Builders Inc. in order to help the company realize a number of its more ambitious timber projects. In 2014, the business affairs of the two companies were separated with Paul Fast assuming full ownership of Fast + Epp and Gerald Epp taking over full control of StructureCraft Builders Inc.

== Notable Projects ==
- EBCO Aerospace Centre, Delta, BC
- Brentwood Skytrain Station, Burnaby, BC
- 2010 Richmond Olympic Oval, Richmond, BC
- Grandview Heights Aquatic Centre, Surrey, BC
- VanDusen Botanical Gardens, Vancouver, BC
- National Arts Centre Rejuvenation, Ottawa, Ontario
- Tallwood House at Brock Commons, University of British Columbia
- Arena Stage at the Mead Center for American Theater, Washington, DC
- Kingsway Pedestrian Bridge, Burnaby, BC
- Mannheim Gridshell Restoration, Germany (ongoing)
- Walmart Home Office Campus, Bentonville, Arkansas (ongoing)
- The Arbour, George Brown College, Toronto, Ontario (ongoing)

== Awards ==
The company has been granted over 100 national and international engineering awards including the 2016 Supreme Award, the highest honour granted by the Institution of Structural Engineers based in London, England, for the design of the timber catenary roof structure of the Grandview Heights Aquatic Centre. Paul Fast was granted the R.A. McLaughlin Award in 2013, the highest annual honour accorded a professional engineer by the Engineers Geoscientists of British Columbia.
