= Structural Awards =

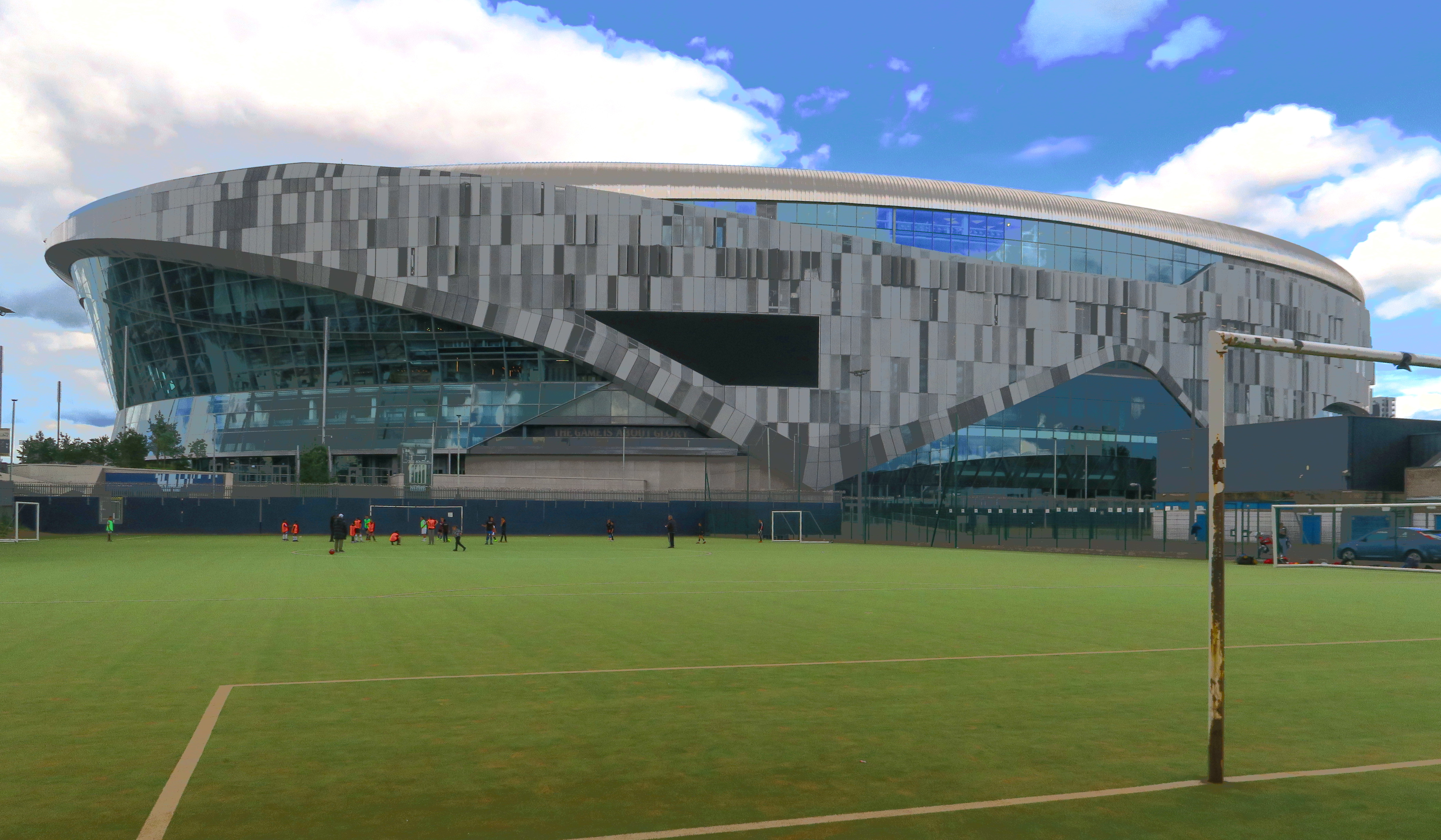
Tottenham Hotspur Stadium by Buro Happold & Schlaich Bergermann Partner, 2019 Supreme Award Winner

The Institution of Structural Engineers' Structural Awards have been awarded for the structural design of buildings and infrastructure since 1968. The awards were re-organised in 2006 to include ten categories and the Supreme Award for structural engineering excellence, the highest award a structural project can win.

The David Alsop Sustainability Award, in memory of David Alsop, who died on 18 October 1996 while a vice president and president elect of the Institution of Structural Engineers, is made for "an outstanding structure which demonstrates excellent coordination of all aspects of the engineering elements and services combined with elegance, life-time economy and respect for the environment in which the structure is built." It was first awarded in 2000.

== Laureates ==
=== Supreme Award ===
The Supreme Award was first awarded in 2003 to recognise the very best of structural engineering design.

Year	Laureate	Winning work		Ref(s)
2019	Buro Happold & Schlaich Bergermann Partner		Tottenham Hotspur Stadium, London, England	
2018	Leonhardt, Andrä und Partner		Tamina Bridge, Switzerland	
2017	Jacobs Engineering Group		British Airways i360, Brighton	
2016	Fast + Epp		Grandview Heights Aquatic Centre, Surrey, British Columbia	
2015	Arup		Singapore Sports Hub, Singapore	
2014	Eckersley O'Callaghan		Glass Lantern, Apple Store, Zorlu Center, Istanbul	
2013	Jiangsu Provincial Communications Planning and Design Institute and Aecom		Taizhou Bridge, China	
2012	Flint & Neill and Sinclair Knight Merz		West Gate Bridge, Australia	
2011	Expedition Engineering		Lee Valley VeloPark, London	
2010	Arup		Stonecutters Bridge, Hong Kong	
2009	Expedition Engineering		Infinity Bridge, Stockton-on-Tees, England	
2008	Arup		Heathrow Terminal 5, England	
2007	Buro Happold & engineers Haskins Robinson Waters		Savill Building, Windsor Great Park, England	
2006	Dar Al-Handasah Consultants	-	Sungai Prai Bridge, Butterworth, [Malaysia	
2005	Not awarded	-	-	
2004	Dewhurst Macfarlane & Partners with Goldreich Engineering PC		David L. Lawrence Convention Center, Pittsburgh, Pennsylvania, USA	
2003	Gifford	;	Gateshead Millennium Bridge, Gateshead, England	

=== Other Categories ===
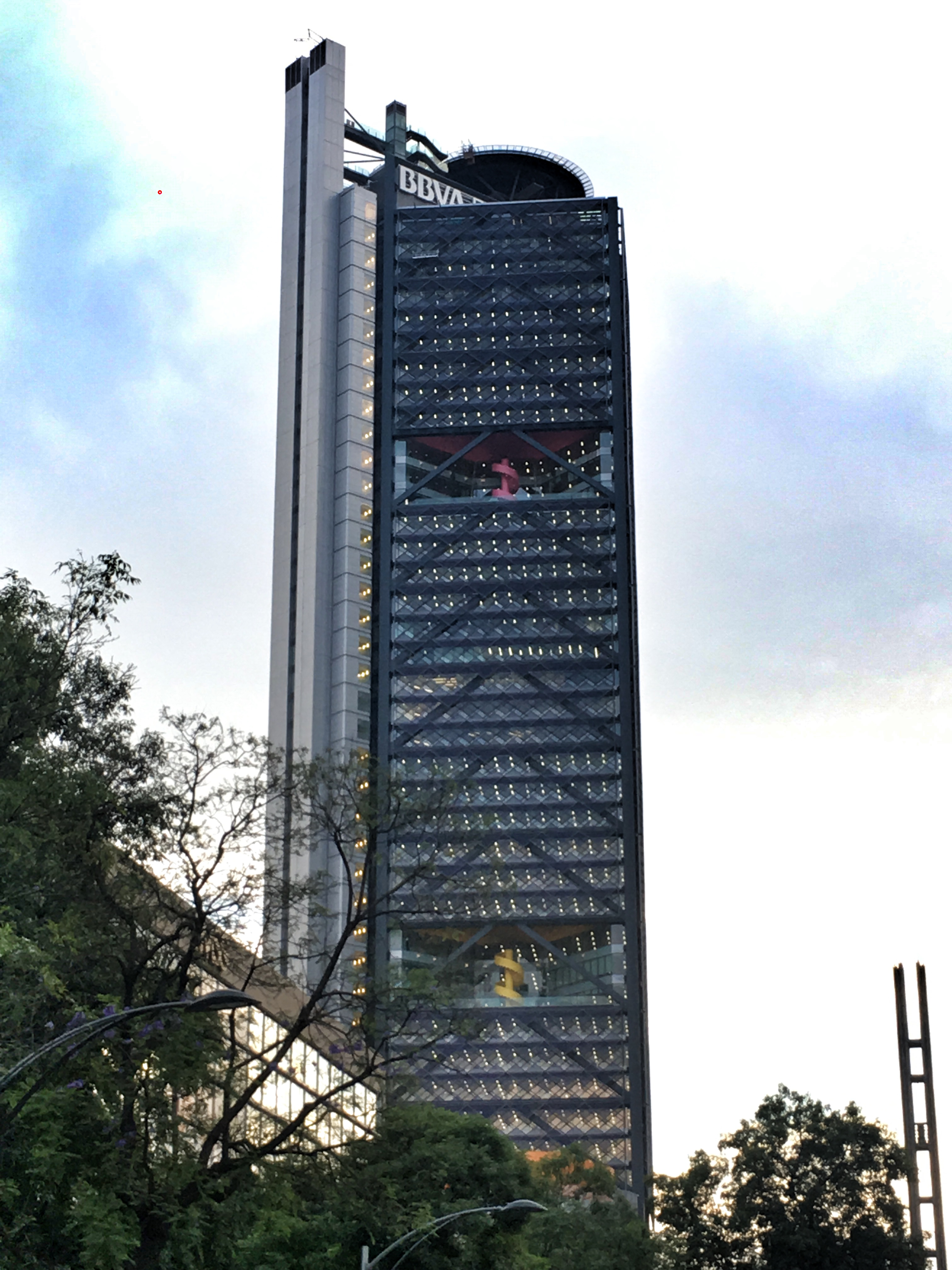
Torre BBVA Bancomer by Arup

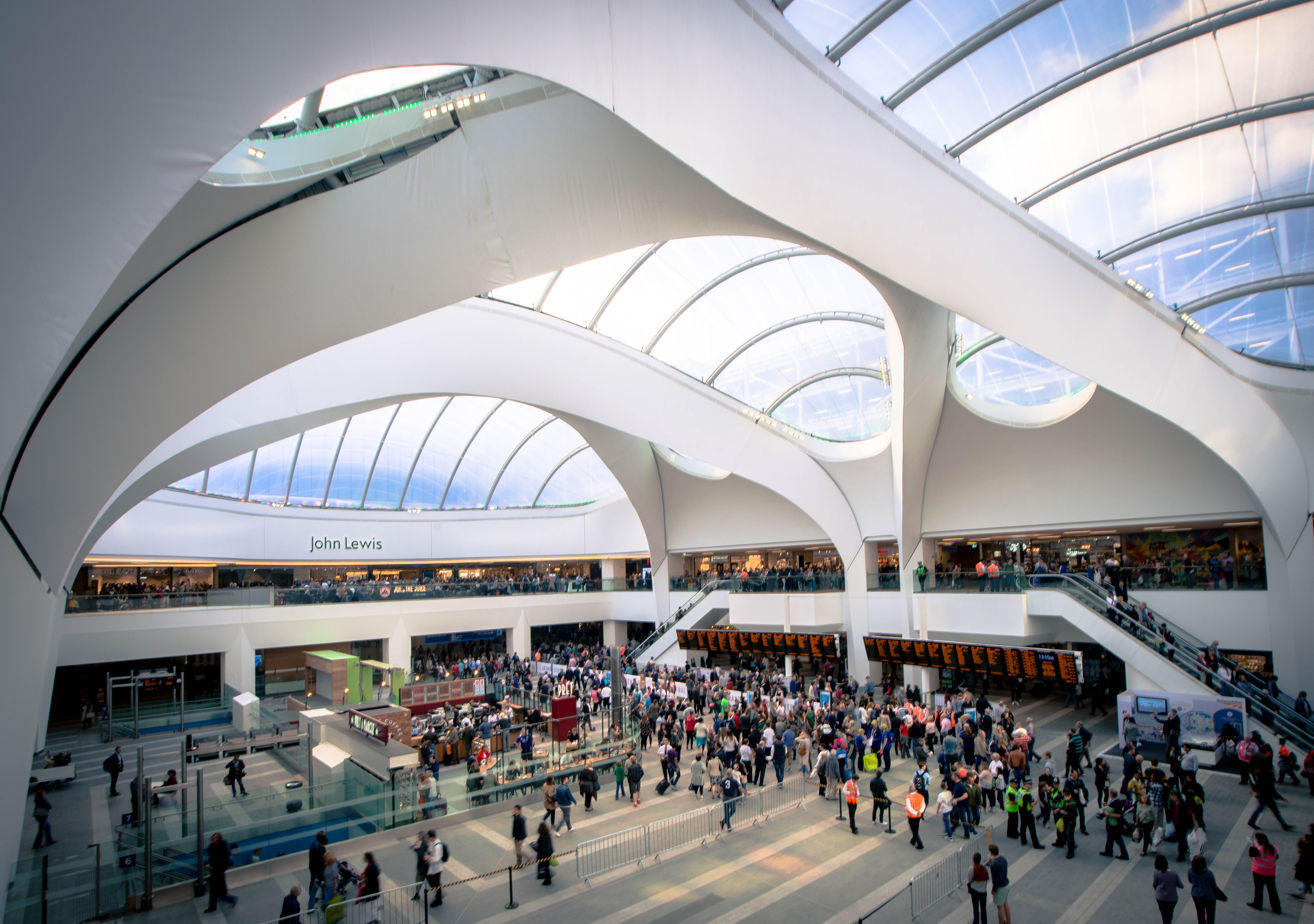
Birmingham New Street Concourse by Atkins & AKT II

==== 2016 ====
- Award for Sustainability: 5 Broadgate, London, England - Buro Happold
- Award for Arts or Entertainment Structures: Stavros Niarchos Foundation Cultural Center, Athens, Greece - Expedition Engineering
- Award for Commercial or Retail Structures: Torre BBVA Bancomer, Mexico City, Mexico - Arup
- Award for Community or Residential Structures: Grandview Heights Aquatic Centre, Surrey, British Columbia - Fast + Epp
- Award for Education or Healthcare Structures: Blavatnik School of Government, University of Oxford, Oxford, Pell Frischmann
- Award for Pedestrian Bridges: Elizabeth Quay Bridge, Perth, Australia - Arup
- Award for Sports or Leisure Structures: City of Manchester Stadium Expansion, Manchester, England - Buro Happold
- Award for Infrastructure or Transportation Structures: Transformation of Birmingham New Street railway station, England - Atkins - AKT II
- Structural Heritage Award: Mount Stewart House, County Down, Northern Ireland, UK - Mann Williams
- Award for Small Projects: Formby Helical Stair, Formby, UK - Webb Yates Engineers
- Award for Small Practices: Expo 2015 Hive, Milan, Italy & London, UK - Simmonds Studio
- Award for Regional Groups: Information Age Gallery, Science Museum, London, UK - Heyne Tillet Steel

Commendations

No commendations were made.

==== 2015 ====
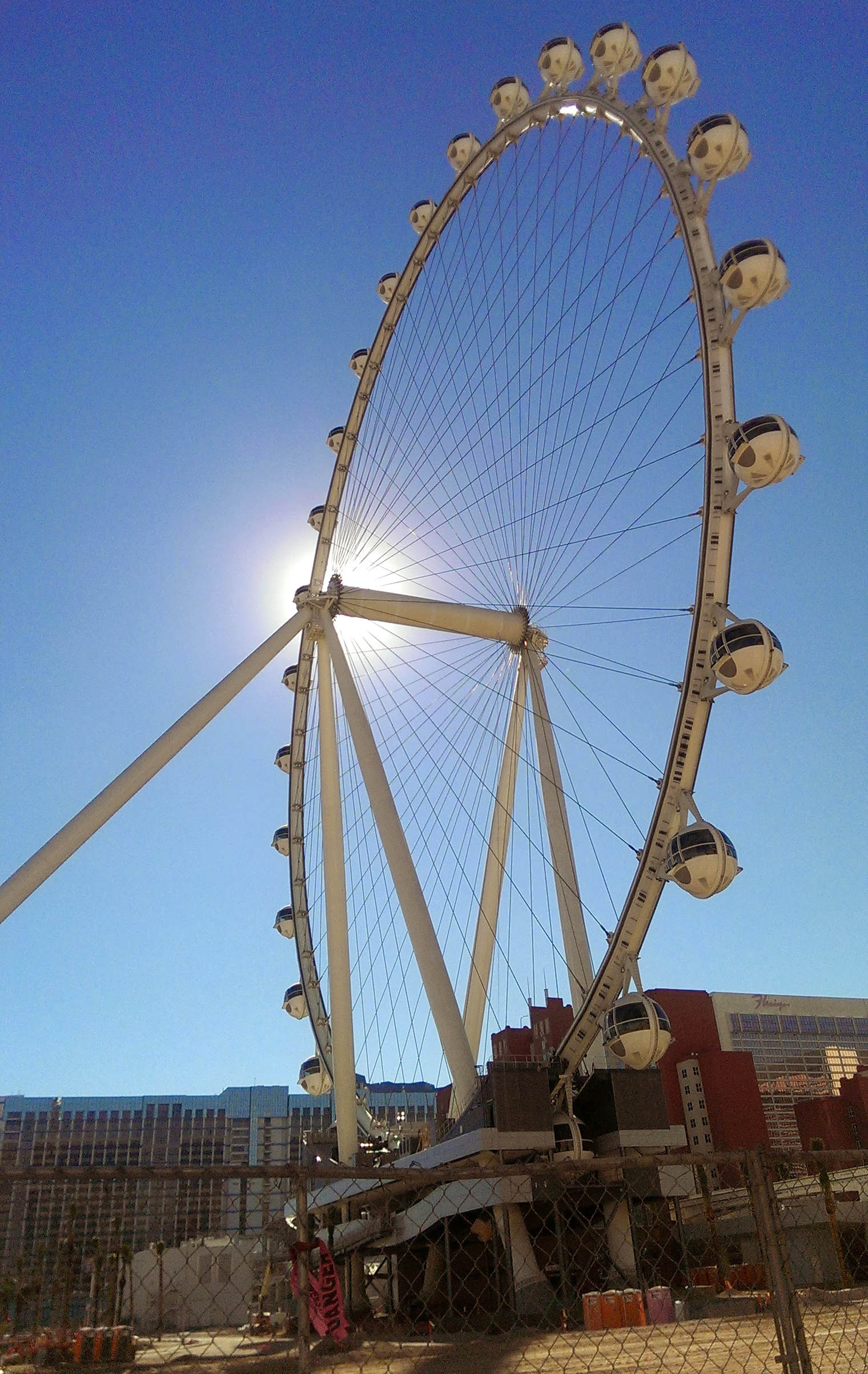
The Vegas High Roller by Arup

Intesa SanPaolo Tower by Expedition Engineering

- Award for Sustainability: Housing for low-income communities in El Salvador - Arup
- Award for Arts or Entertainment Structures: The Vegas High Roller, Las Vegas, United States - Arup
- Award for Commercial or Retail Structures: Intesa SanPaolo Tower, Turin, Italy - Expedition Engineering - Studio Ossola
- Award for Community or Residential Structures: Malapa Hominid Fossil Site Cover + Visitors' Platform, Malapa, South Africa - Fellows Consulting
- Award for Education or Healthcare Structures: Melbourne School of Design, Melbourne, Australia - IrwinConsult
- Award for Pedestrian Bridges: Greenwich Reach Swing Bridge, London, UK - Flint & Neill
- Award for Sports or Leisure Structures: Singapore Sports Hub, Singapore - Arup
- Award for Infrastructure or Transportation Structures: Anaheim Regional Transportation Intermodal Center (ARTIC), Anaheim, California - Thornton Tomasetti
- Structural Heritage Award: Restoration of Victoria Theatre and Concert Hall, Singapore - T.Y. Lin International Pte. Ltd
- Award for Highway or Railway Bridge Structures: Schuman Bridge, Lyon, France - Flint & Neill
- Award for Small Projects: Stage by the Sea, Littlehampton, UK - Expedition Engineering
- Award for Small Practices: Steel and Glass Features for the 300th Anniversary of Omsk, Russia - Malishev Engineers
- Award for Regional Groups: The SSE Hydro, Glasgow, Scotland - Arup

Commendations

- For Commercial or Retail Structures: Believe in Better Building - Arup Associates and Engenuiti
- For Education or Healthcare Structures: Alfriston School Swimming Pool, Beaconsfield, UK - Elliott Wood Partnership
- For Pedestrian Bridges: Jim Stynes Bridge, Melbourne, Australia - Aurecon
- For Pedestrian Bridges: Merchant Square Footbridge, London, UK - Knight Architects and AKT II
- For Small Projects: Central London Stone Stair - Webb Yates Engineers

==== 2014 ====
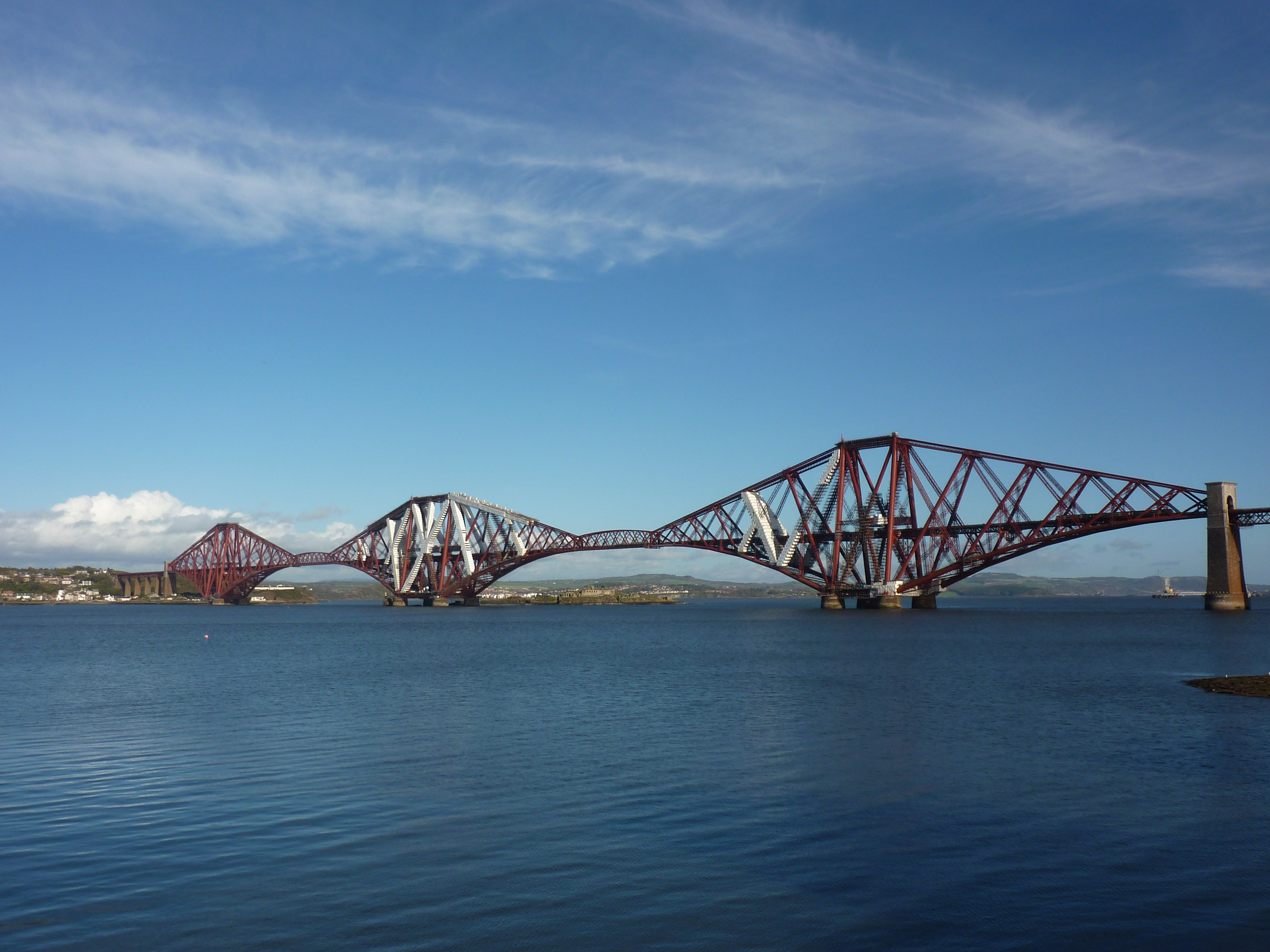
Forth Rail Bridge undergoing repainting, by Pell Frischmann

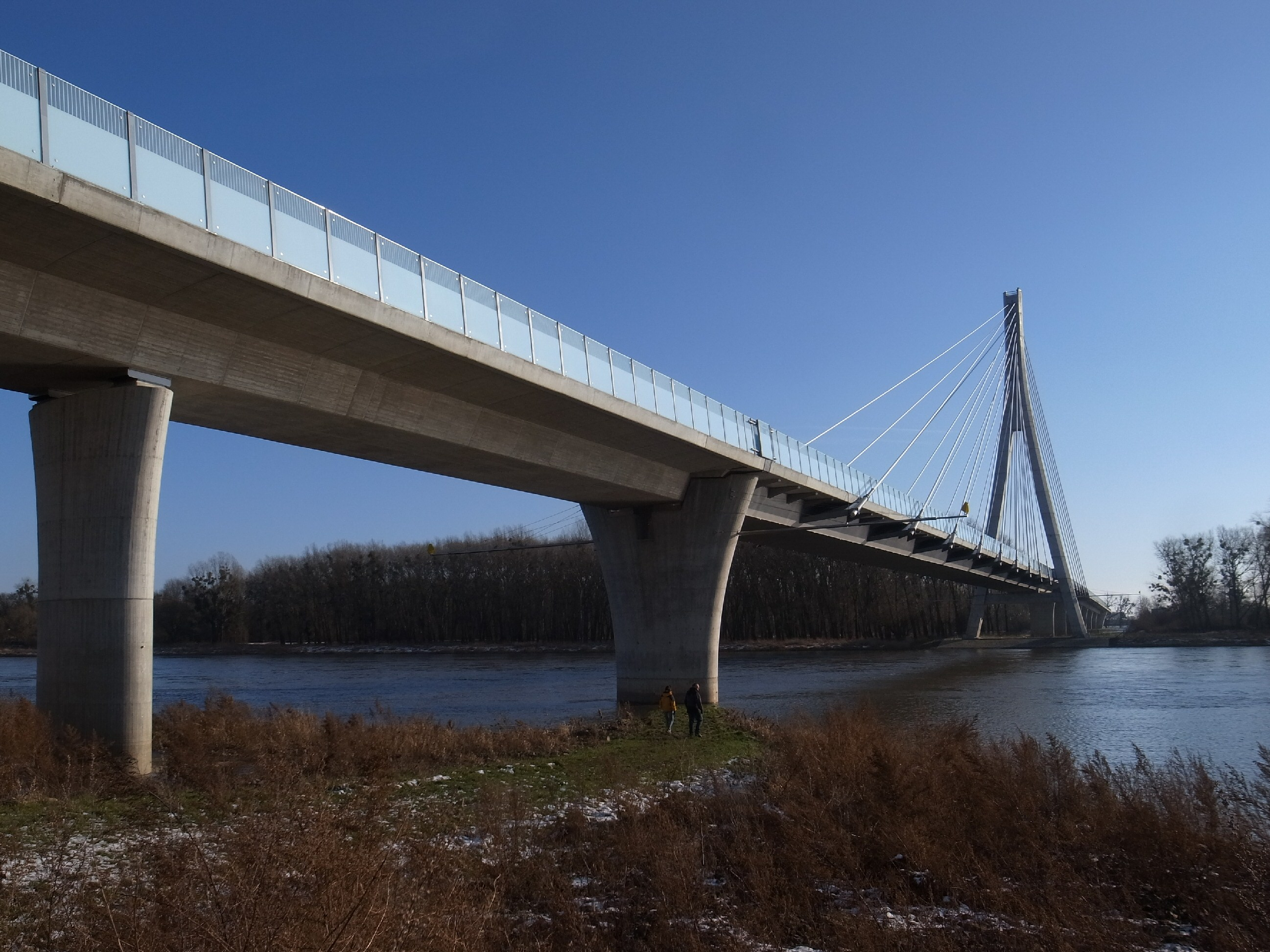
Elbebridge Schönebeck

- Award for Sustainability: Muregeya Bridge - Ove Arup & Partners
- Award for Arts or Entertainment Structures: Reid Building, Glasgow School of Art - Arup
- Award for Commercial or Retail Structures: Glass Lantern, Apple Zorlu - Eckersley O'Callaghan
- Award for Community or Residential Structures: Kew House - Price & Myers
- Award for Education or Healthcare Structures: WWF Living Planet Centre - Expedition Engineering
- Award for Pedestrian Bridges: Footbridge over the Bow, Banff, Alberta - Fast + Epp
- Award for Sports or Leisure Structures: Adelaide Oval Redevelopment - Arup
- Award for Infrastructure or Transportation Structures: Pulkovo Airport - Ramboll
- Structural Heritage Award: Forth Rail Bridge Restoration - Pell Frischmann
- Award for Highway or Railway Bridge Structures: Elbebridge Schönebeck - Leonhardt, Andrä und Partner
- Award for Small Projects: Somerset House, The Miles Stair - Techniker
- Award for Small Practices: Lower Hātea River Crossing (Te Matau a Pohe) - Knight Architects / Peters & Cheung
- Award for Regional Groups: Bangor Aurora Aquatic & Leisure Complex - WYG

Commendations

- For Sustainability: WWF Living Planet Centre - Expedition Engineering
- For Commercial or Retail Structures: Trimble Navigation's Office, Christchurch - Opus International Consultants
- For Community or Residential Structures: Temple Lodge - Ramboll
- For Highway or Railway Bridge Structures: Shenyang Hun River Ribbon Bridge - Tongji Architectural Design (Group) Co., Ltd.
- For Pedestrian Bridges: Muregeya Bridge - Ove Arup & Partners
- For Small Projects: Red Bridge House - Lyons O'Neill Ltd
- For Sports or Leisure Structures: Hazza Bin Zayed Stadium - Thornton Tomasetti
- For Structural Heritage: Manchester Town Hall Complex Transformation Programme - URS

==== 2013 ====
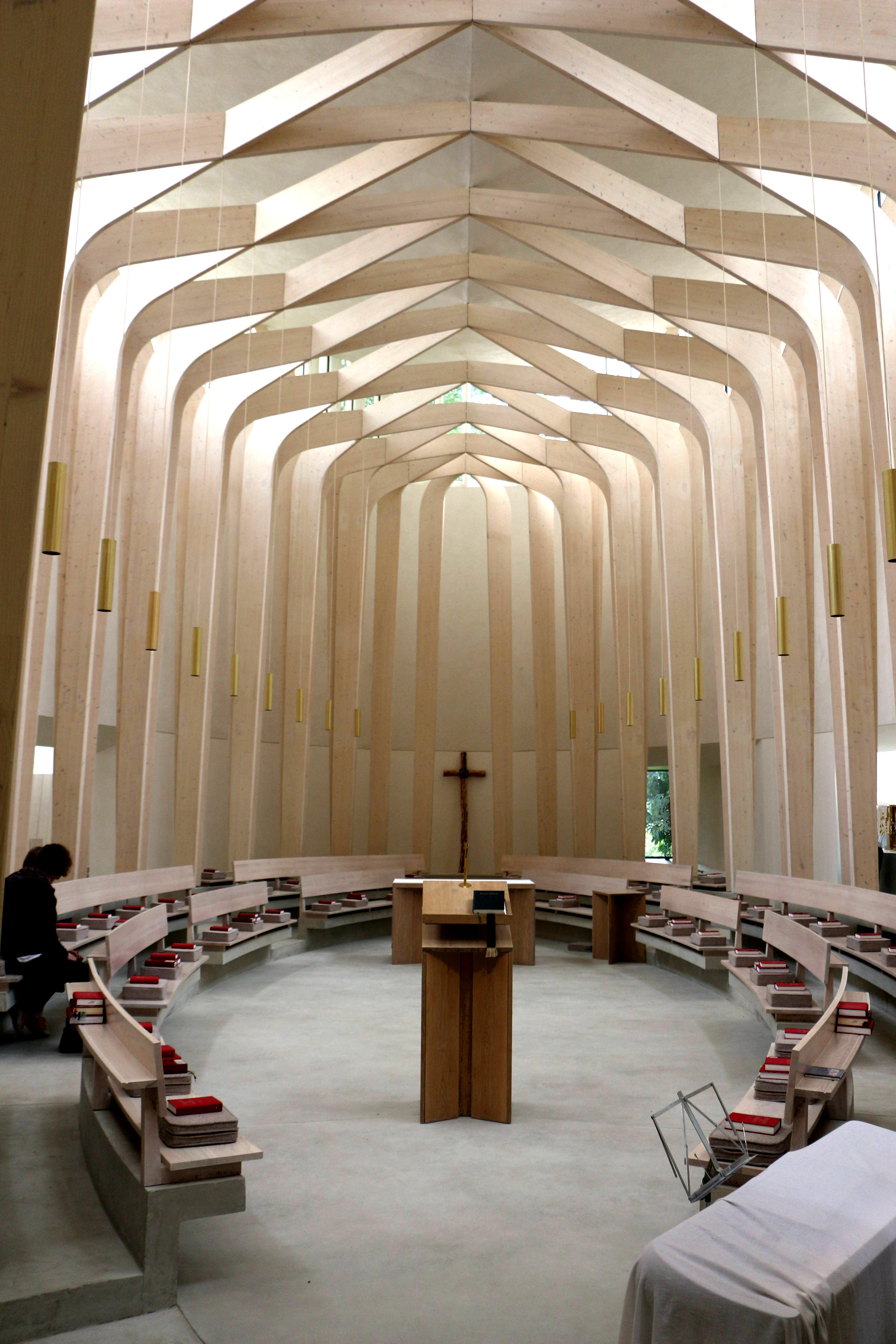
Bishop Edward King Chapel by Price & Myers

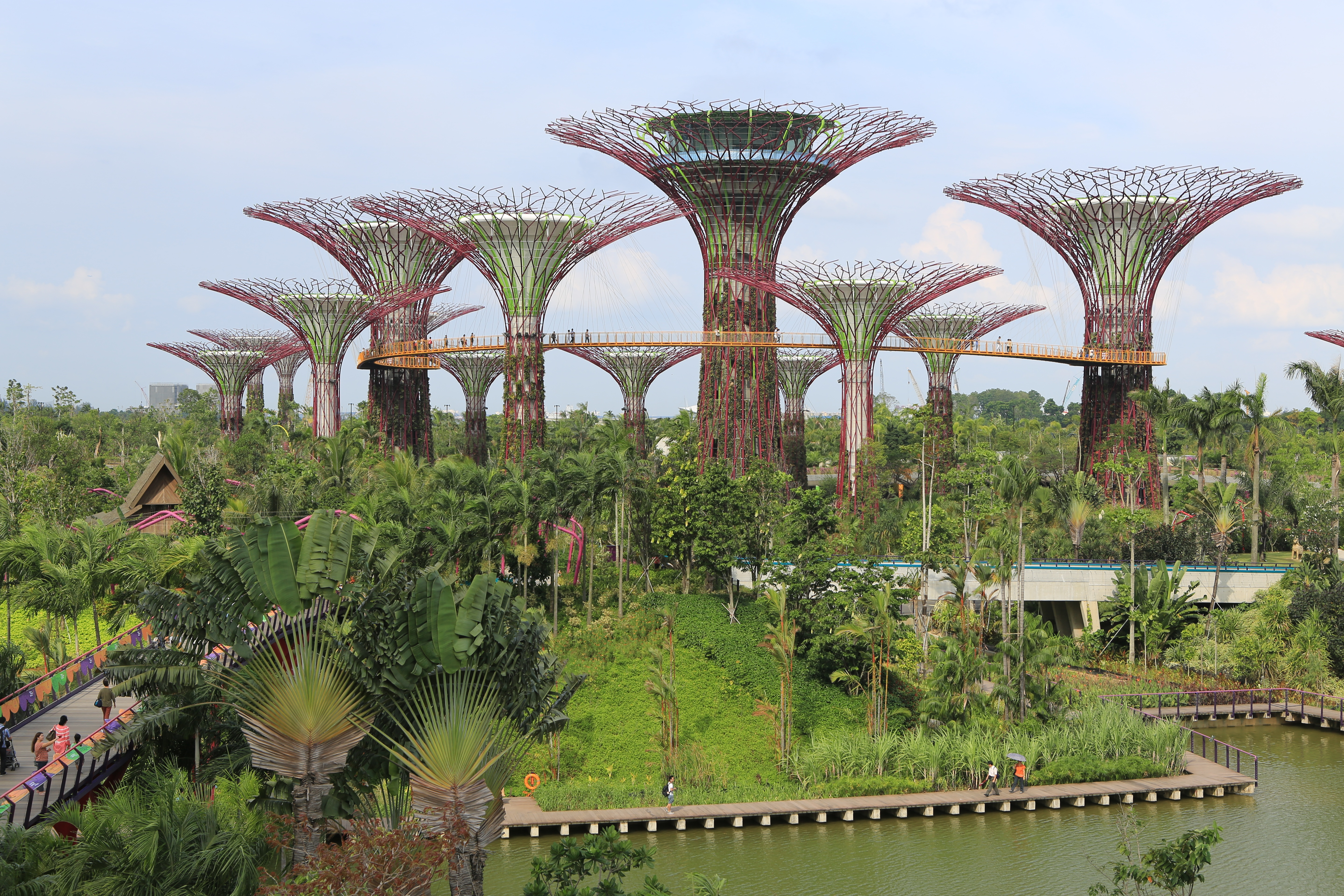
Gardens by the Bay by Atelier One and Meinhardt Infrastructure

- Award for Sustainability: Halley VI Antarctic Research Station by Aecom (formerly Faber Maunsell)
- Award for Arts or Entertainment Structures: Gardens by the Bay - Atelier One and Meinhardt Infrastructure
- Award for Commercial or Retail Structures: CCTV Headquarters - Arup
- Award for Community or Residential Structures: Bishop Edward King Chapel - Price & Myers
- Award for Education or Healthcare Structures: The University of Exeter Forum - Buro Happold
- Award for Pedestrian Bridges: Pembroke College footbridge - Price & Myers
- Award for Sports or Leisure Structures: First Direct Arena - Arup
- Award for Infrastructure or Transportation Structures: Emirates Air Line - Expedition Engineering, Buro Happold and URS
- Structural Heritage Award: Cutty Sark Restoration - Buro Happold
- Award for Highway or Railway Bridge Structures: Taizhou Bridge - Jiangsu Provincial Communications Planning and Design Institute and Aecom
- Award for Small Projects: KREOD Pavilion - Ramboll
- Award for Small Practices: Feature stairs for the new Mariinsky Theatre - Malishev Engineers

Commendations

- For Commercial or Retail Structures: The Shard - WSP
- For Commercial or Retail Structures: Trinity Leeds gridshell roof - Sinclair Knight Merz
- For Community or Residential Structures: Tsingtao Pearl Visitor Centre - Fast + Epp
- For Education or Healthcare Structures: Botanical Garden Hothouse - Søren Jensen Consulting Engineers
- For Structural Heritage: Tynemouth Metro station - Ramboll
- For Small Projects: Castle Green Bridge - Flint & Neill

==== 2012 ====
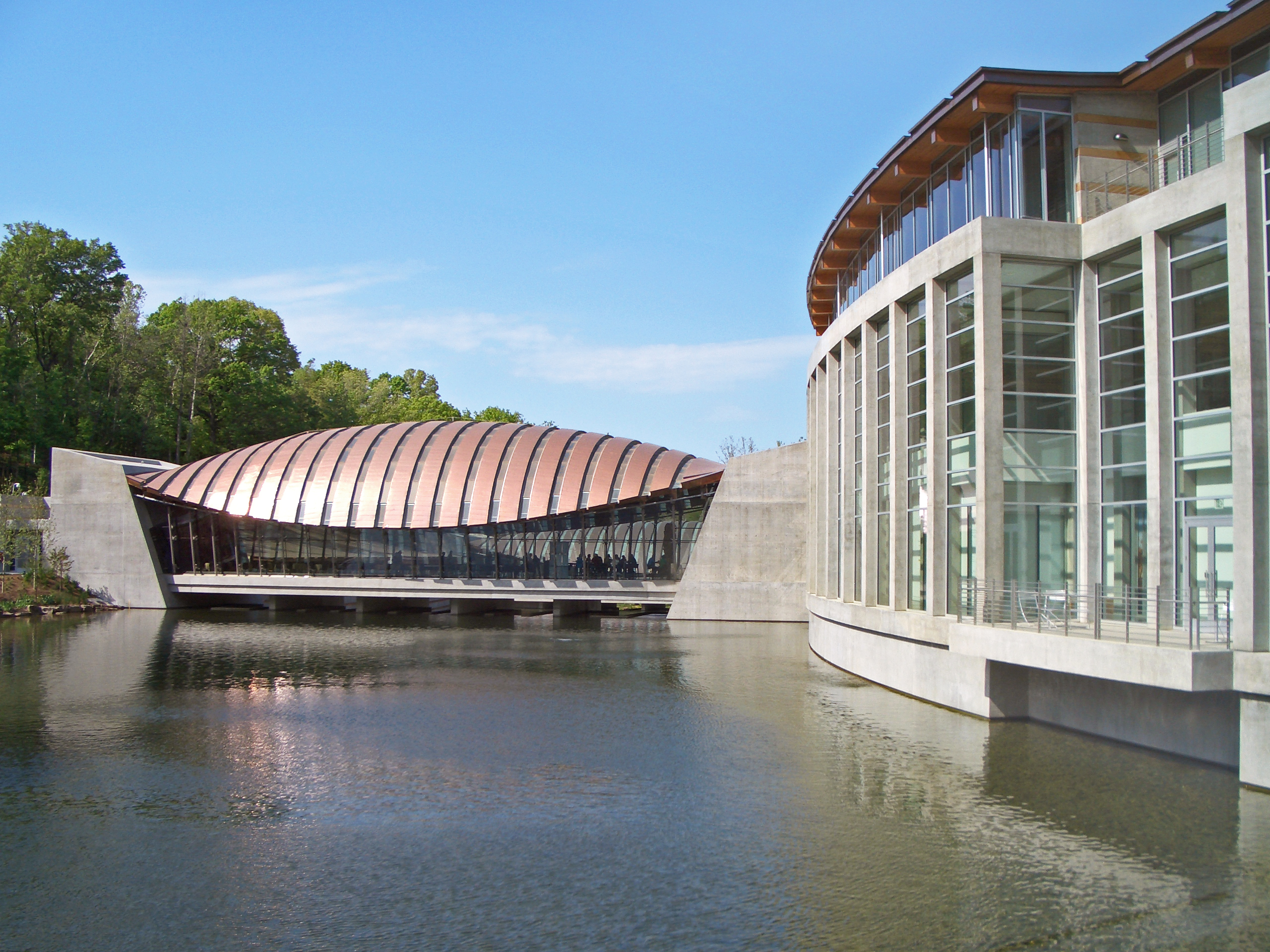
Crystal Bridges Museum of American Art by Buro Happold

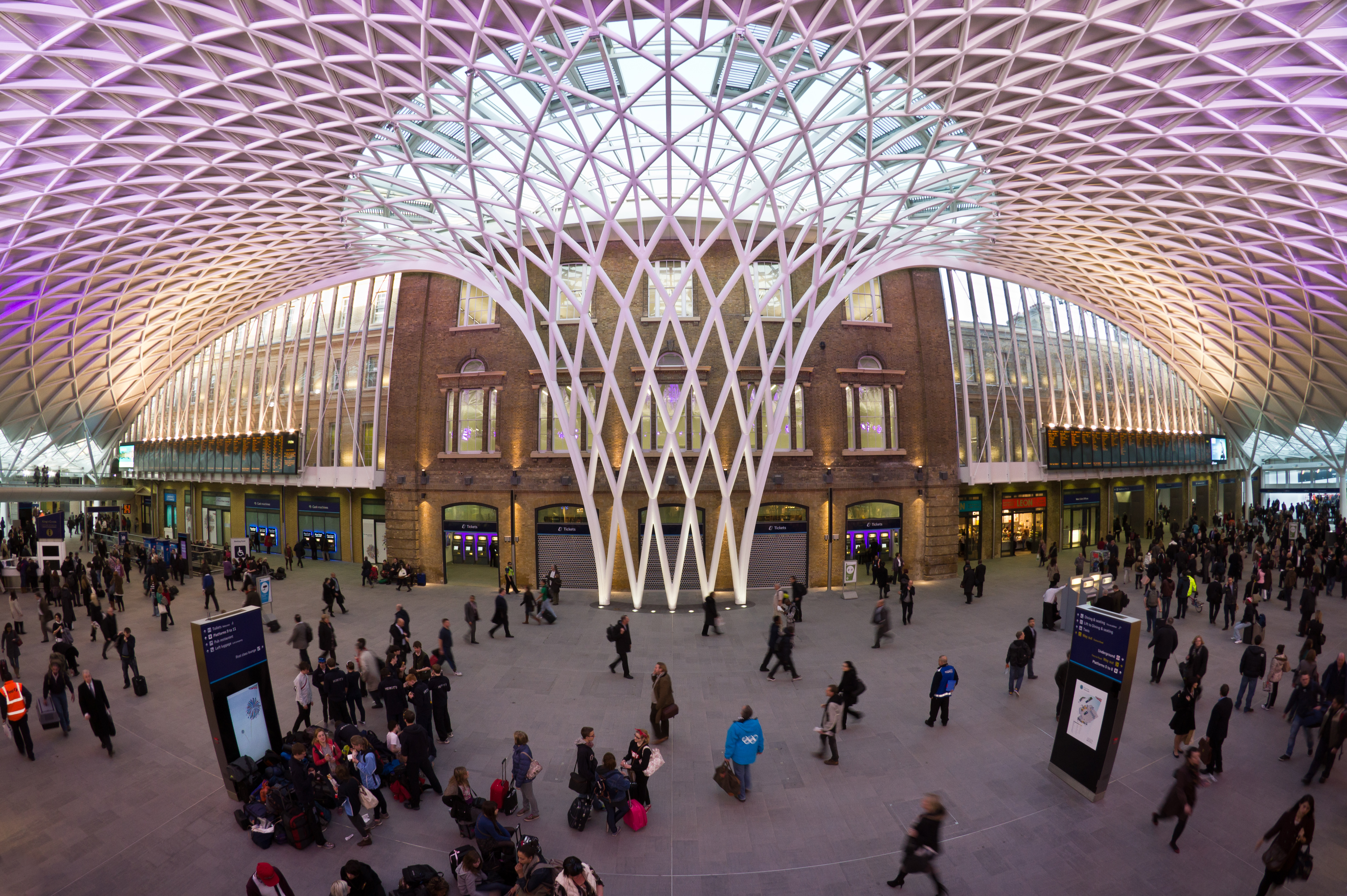
London King's Cross railway station redevelopment by Arup

- Sustainability Award: Conservation and Restoration of the Iron Market, Port-au-Prince, Haiti - Alan Baxter and Associates
- Award for Arts or Entertainment Structures: Crystal Bridges Museum of American Art, Bentonville, Arkansas - Buro Happold
- Award for Commercial or Retail Structures: Al Hamra Tower, Kuwait City, Kuwait - Skidmore, Owings & Merrill
- Award for Community or Residential Structures: VanDusen Botanical Garden Visitor Centre, Vancouver, British Columbia, Canada - Fast + Epp
- Award for Education or Healthcare Structures: the Tunbridge Wells Hospital, Tunbridge Wells, Kent, England - Ramboll
- Award for Pedestrian Bridges: Jarrold Bridge, Norwich, England - Ramboll
- Award for Sports or Leisure Structures: London Stadium, Stratford, England - Buro Happold
- Award for Infrastructure or Transportation Structures: London King's Cross railway station Redevelopment, London, England - Arup
- Structural Heritage Award: West Gate Bridge Strengthening, Melbourne, Victoria, Australia - West Gate Bridge Strengthening Alliance
- Award for Highway or Railway Bridge Structures: Compiègne Bridge, France - Flint & Neill
- Award for Small Projects: Rise (sculpture), Belfast, Northern Ireland - Price & Myers
- Award for Small Practices: Retention and Relocation of Facade at Chenil House, London, England - Considine Consulting

Commendations

- For Education or Healthcare Structures: Centre for Interactive Research on Sustainability, Vancouver, British Columbia, Canada - Fast + Epp
- For Pedestrian Bridges: Peace Bridge (Foyle), Derry, Northern Ireland - AECOM
- For Structural Heritage: Victoria Memorial Museum Rehabilitation, Ottawa, Ontario, Canada - Parsons Brinckerhoff Halsall
- For Structural Heritage: Conservation and Restoration of the Iron Market, Port-au-Prince, Haiti - Alan Baxter and Associates
- For Highway or Railway Bridge Structures: Twin Sails Bridge, Poole, England - Ramboll
- For Small Practices: Georgia Ministry of Justice Prosecutor's Office, Georgia - Engenuiti

==== 2011 ====
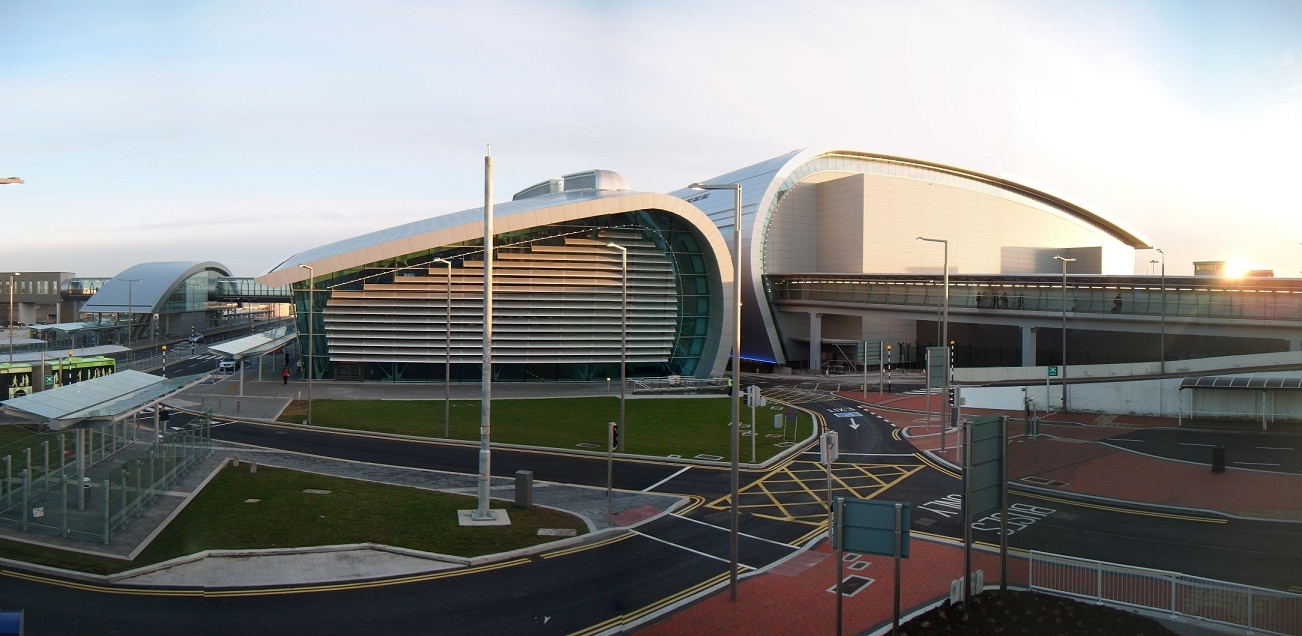
Dublin Airport Terminal 2 by Arup

- Heritage Award for Buildings or Infrastructure Projects: Royal Shakespeare Theatre redevelopment, Stratford upon Avon, England - Buro Happold
- Award for Pedestrian Bridges: Media City Footbridge, Manchester, England - Gifford
- Award for Transportation Structures: Dublin Airport Terminal 2, Dublin, Ireland - Arup
- Award for Commercial or Retail Structures: Khan Shatyr Entertainment Center, Astana, Kazakhstan - Buro Happold
- Award for Education or Healthcare Structures: NMIT Arts and Media Centre, Nelson, New Zealand - Aurecon
- Award for Community or Residential Structures: Elsinore Culture Yard, Elsinore, Denmark - Søren Jensen Consulting Engineers
- Award for Sports Structures: London Velodrome, England - Expedition Engineering
- Award for Arts, Leisure or Entertainment Structures: Las Arenas Bullring, Barcelona, Spain - Expedition Engineering
- Award for Industrial or Process Structures: Port Phillip Estate, Red Hill, Victoria, Australia - Arup
- Award for Small Practices: Westgate Bridge Suspended Access Platforms, Melbourne, Australia - Alan White Design
- David Alsop Sustainability Award: Wales Institute for Sustainable Education, Powys, Wales - Buro Happold
- Award for Small Projects: Bridge of Dreams, Princeton, Canada - Fast + Epp

Commendations

- For Heritage Infrastructure: Mizen Head Footbridge, County Cork, Ireland - Gifford
- For Pedestrian Bridges: Redhayes Bridge, Exeter, England - Parsons Brinckerhoff
- For Community or Residential Structures: Bramall Learning Centre, Harrogate, England - Gifford
- For Sports Structures: Aviva Stadium, Dublin, Ireland - Buro Happold
- For Sustainability: Lee Valley VeloPark, England - Expedition Engineering
- For Sustainability: Open Academy, Norwich, England - Ramboll

==== 2010 ====
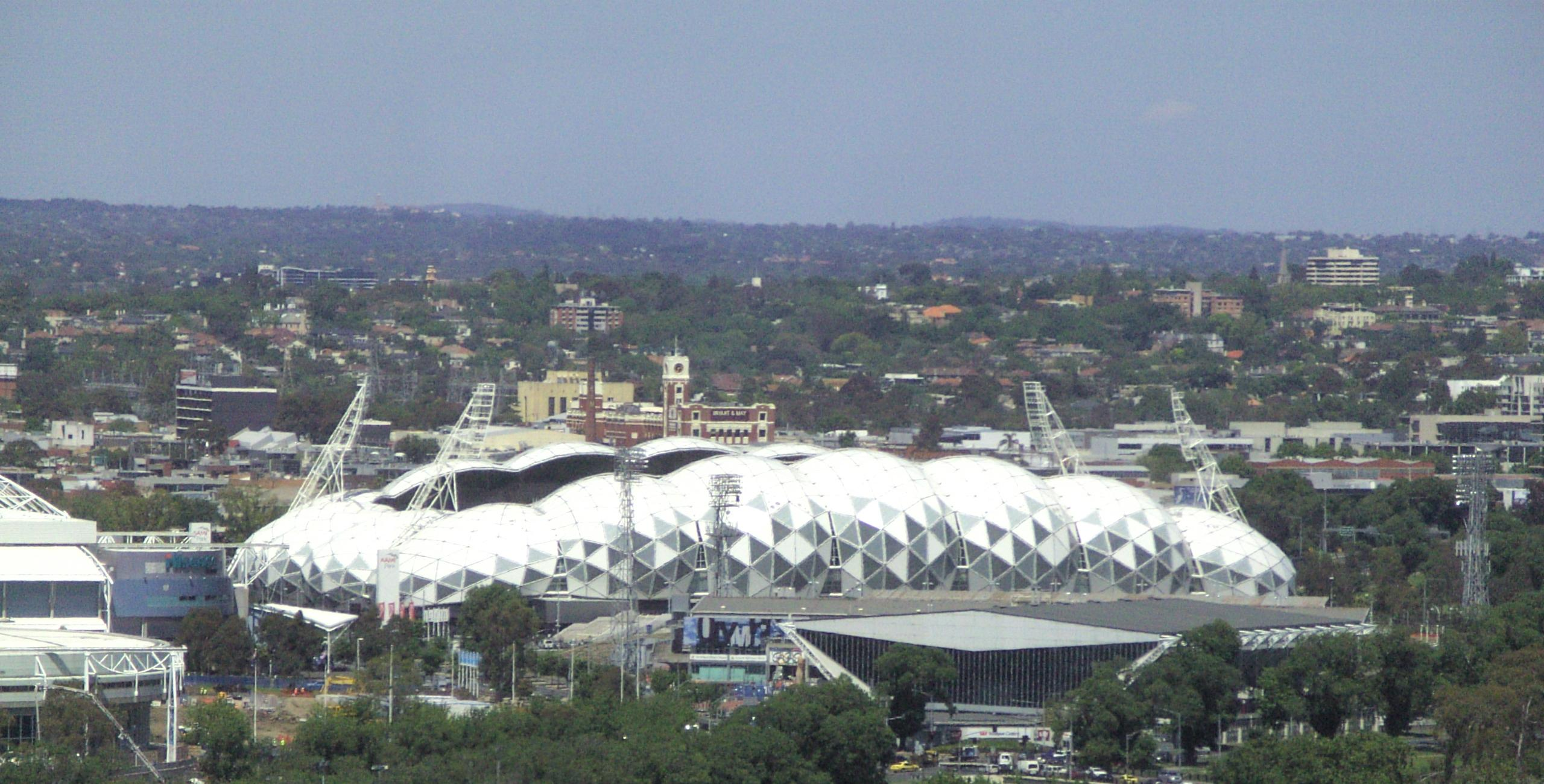
Melbourne Rectangular Stadium by Arup

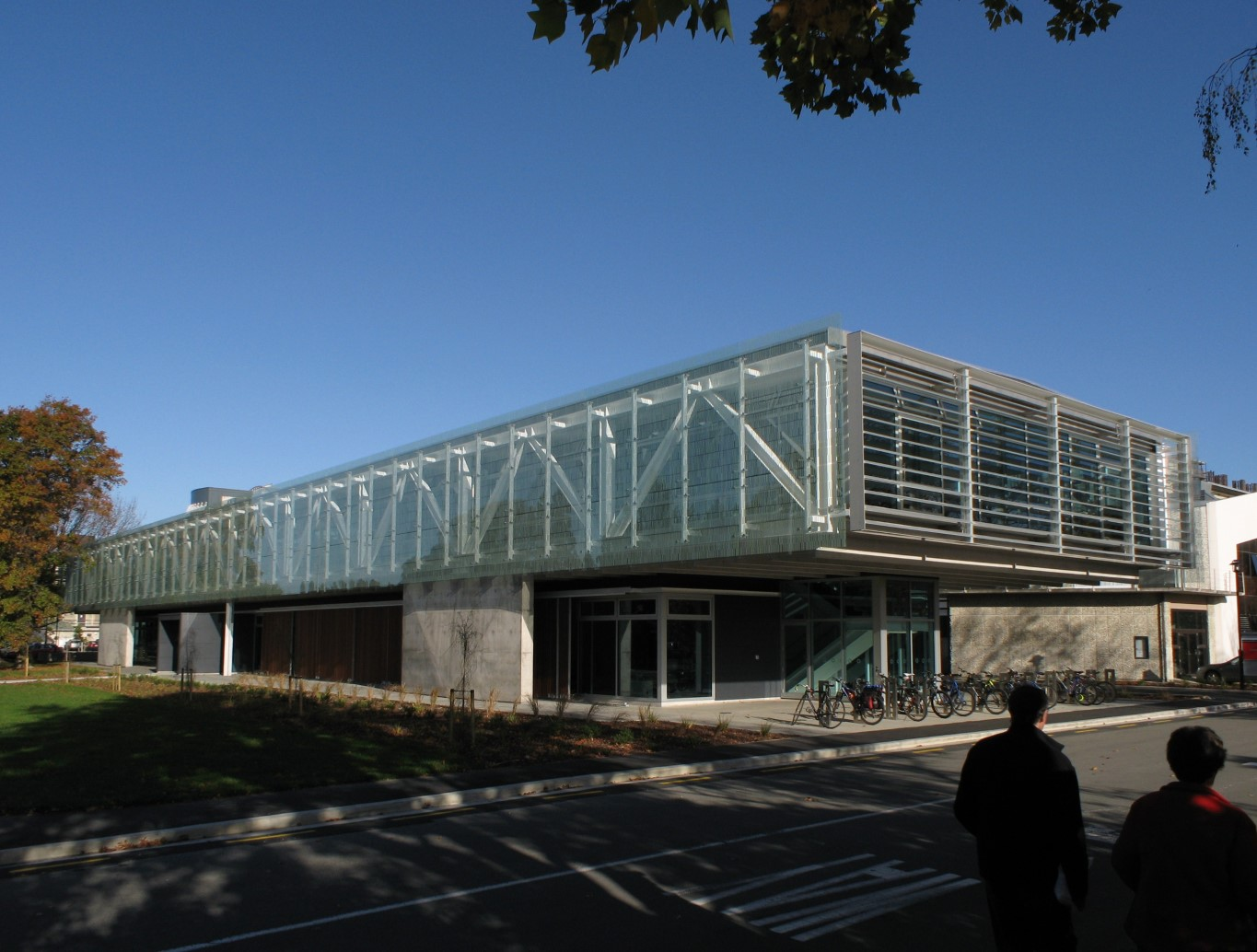
NZi3 Innovation Institute Building by Beca

- Heritage Award for Buildings or Infrastructure Projects: Supreme Court of New Zealand - Holmes Consulting Group
- Award for Pedestrian Bridges: Meads Reach Bridge, Bristol, England - Price & Myers
- Award for Transportation Structures: Stonecutters Bridge, Hong Kong - Arup
- Award for Commercial or Retail Structures: Burj Khalifa, Dubai - Skidmore, Owings & Merrill
- Award for Education or Healthcare Structures: NZi3 Innovation Institute Building, Canterbury, New Zealand - Beca
- Award for Community or Residential Structures: Chips, Manchester, England - Martin Stockley Associates
- Award for Arts, Leisure or Entertainment Structures: John Hope Gateway, Edinburgh, Scotland - Buro Happold
- Award for Sports Structures: Melbourne Rectangular Stadium, Melbourne, Australia - Arup
- David Alsop Sustainability Award: Forth Road Bridge Main Cable Project - AECOM
- Award for Small Projects: Serpentine Gallery Pavilion 2009, London, England - Arup

Commendations

- For Pedestrian Bridges: Forthside Bridge - Gifford
- For Transportation Structures: Dubai Metro (Red Line) - Atkins
- For Commercial or Retail Structures: Apple Store Upper West Side - Eckersley O’Callaghan Structural Design
- For Education or Healthcare Structures: The London Clinic - New Cancer Centre - Alan Baxter Associates LLP
- For Community or Residential Structures: Hull History Centre, Hull, England - Alan Baxter Associates LLP
- For Sustainability: Queen Elizabeth II Court, Hampshire, England - Gifford

==== 2009 ====
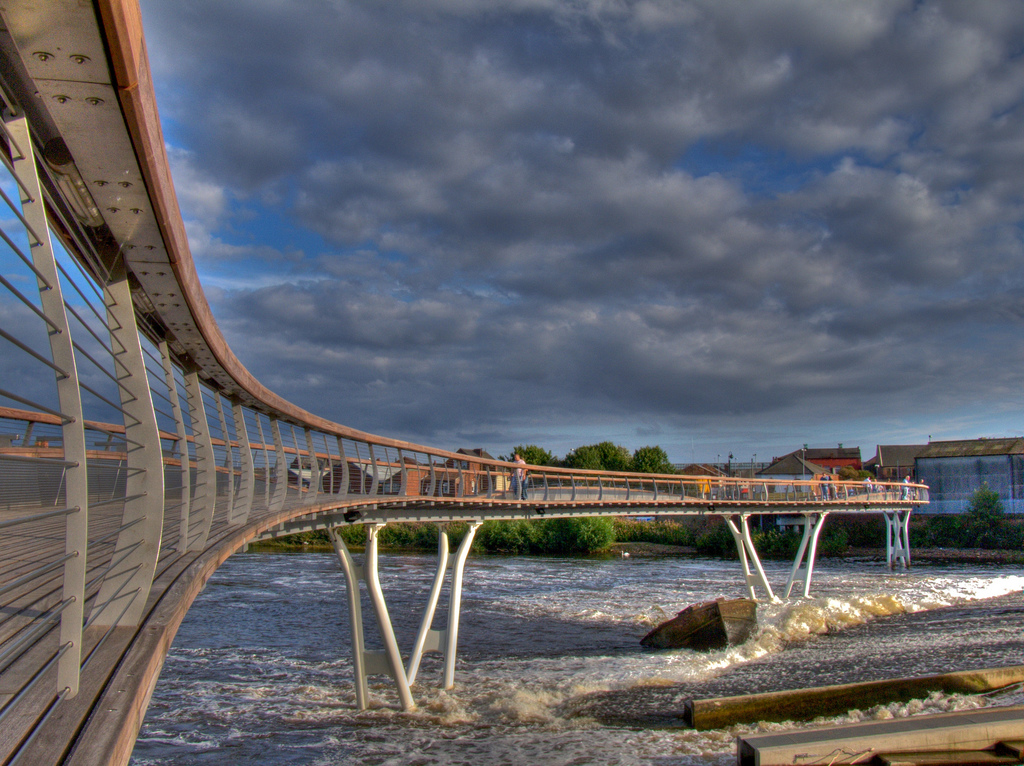
Castleford Bridge by Alan Baxter & Associates

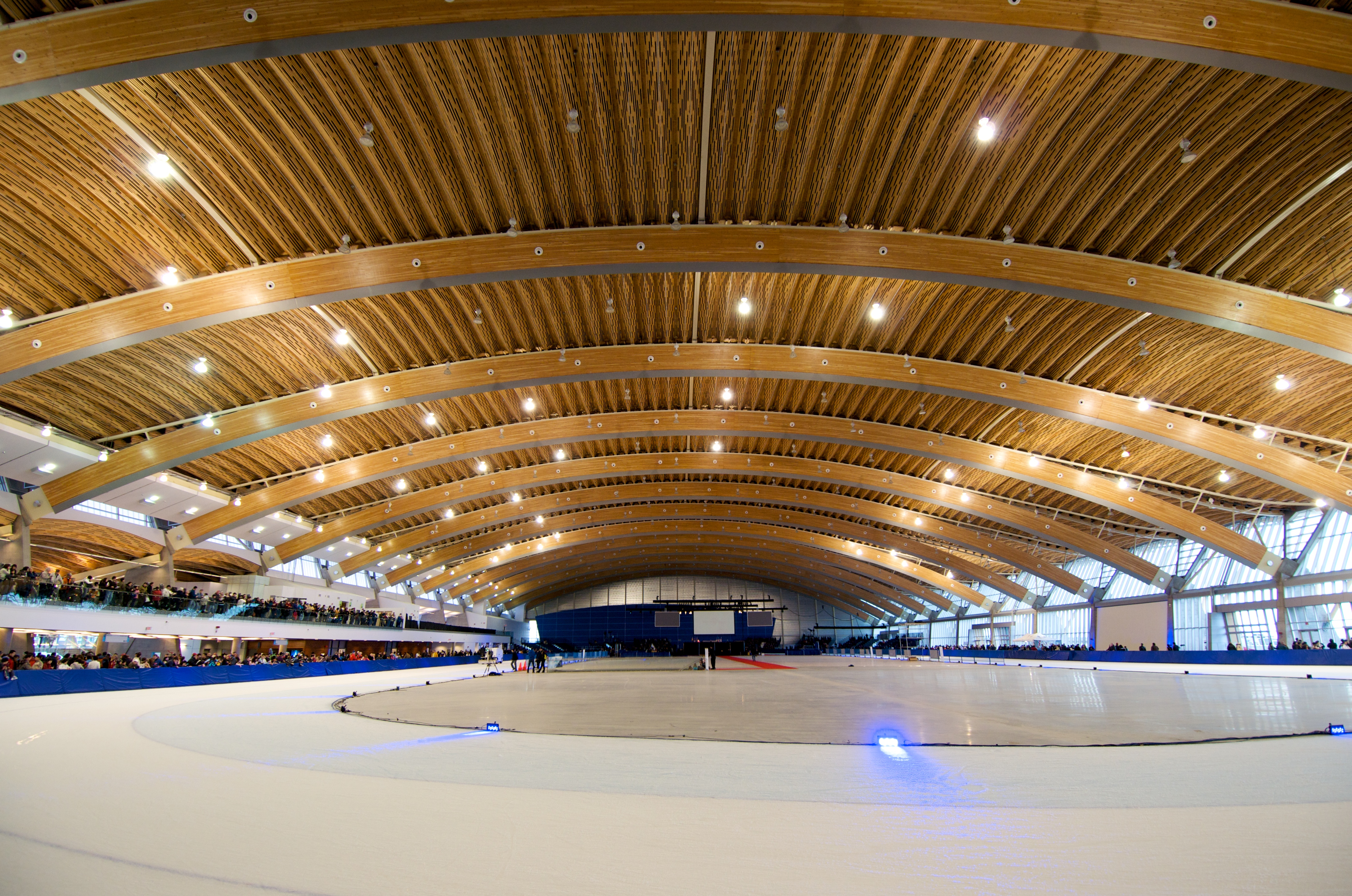
Richmond Olympic Oval Roof by Fast + Epp Structural Engineers

- Heritage Award for Buildings: St Martin in the Fields - Alan Baxter & Associates
- Heritage Award for Infrastructure: Not awarded
- Award for Pedestrian Bridges: Infinity Footbridge - Expedition Engineering
- Award for Transportation Structures: Clackmannanshire Bridge at Kincardine - Scott Wilson Group Incorporating Benaim
- Award for Commercial or Retail Structures: Cabot Circus Roof, Bristol - Sinclair Knight Merz
- Award for Education or Healthcare Structures: Te Puni Village, Wellington, New Zealand - Aurecon
- Award for Community or Residential Structures: The Cathedral of Christ the Light, California, United States - Skidmore, Owings & Merrill
- Award for Sports Structures: Richmond Olympic Oval roof, Richmond, British Columbia, Canada - Fast + Epp Structural Engineers
- Award for Arts, Leisure or Entertainment Structures: Natural History Museum's Darwin Centre Phase Two, London - Arup
- Award for Industrial or Process Structures: Bodegas Protos Winery, Penafiel, Valladolid, Spain - Arup
- David Alsop Sustainability Award: Mapungubwe National Park Interpretive Centre, Mapungubwe National Park, South Africa - Henry Fagan & Partners, John Ochsendorf & Michael Ramage
- Award for Small Projects: Serpentine Gallery Summer Pavilion 2008 London - Arup

Commendations

- For Heritage Infrastructure: Canford Bridge, Dorset, England - Buro Happold
- For Pedestrian Bridge: Castleford Bridge, Castleford, England - Alan Baxter & Associates
- For Pedestrian Bridge: Bishops Stortford Goods Yard Footbridge - Gifford
- For Commercial or Retail Structure: 201 Bishopsgate and the Broadgate Tower - Skidmore, Owings & Merrill
- For Arts or Entertainment Structure: Curtis R Priem Experimental Media and Performing Arts Center, Troy, New York, United States - Buro Happold
- For Industrial or Process Structure: Advanced Manufacturing Research Centre, University of Sheffield, England - Buro Happold
- For Industrial or Process Structure: Lakeside Energy from Waste Plant, Slough, England - Royal Haskoning
- For Sustainability: Richmond Olympic Oval roof, Richmond, British Columbia, Canada - Fast + Epp Structural Engineers
- For Small Projects: Rudolph Steiner House, London, England - Gifford

==== 2008 ====
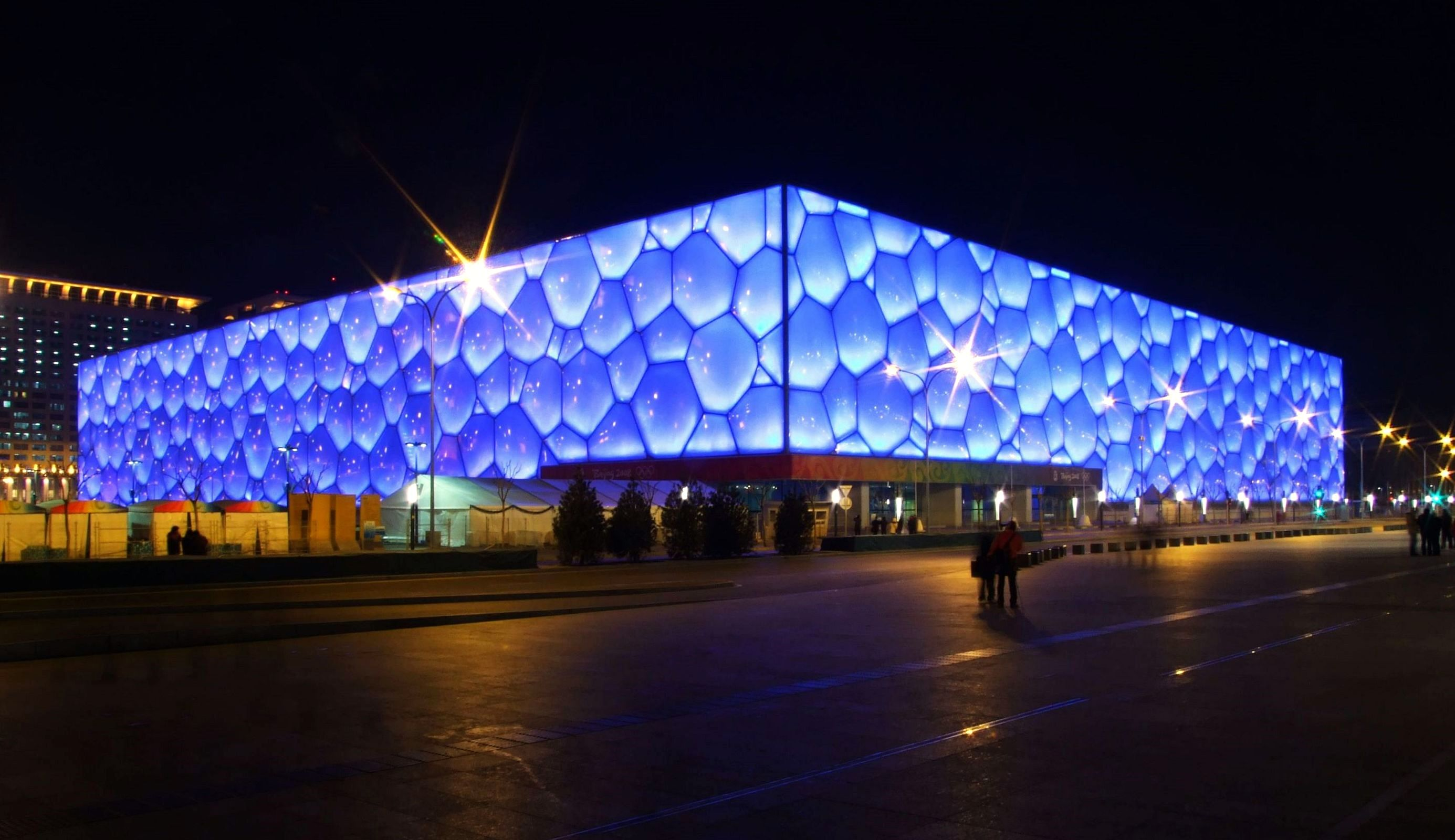
Beijing Olympic Water Cube by Arup

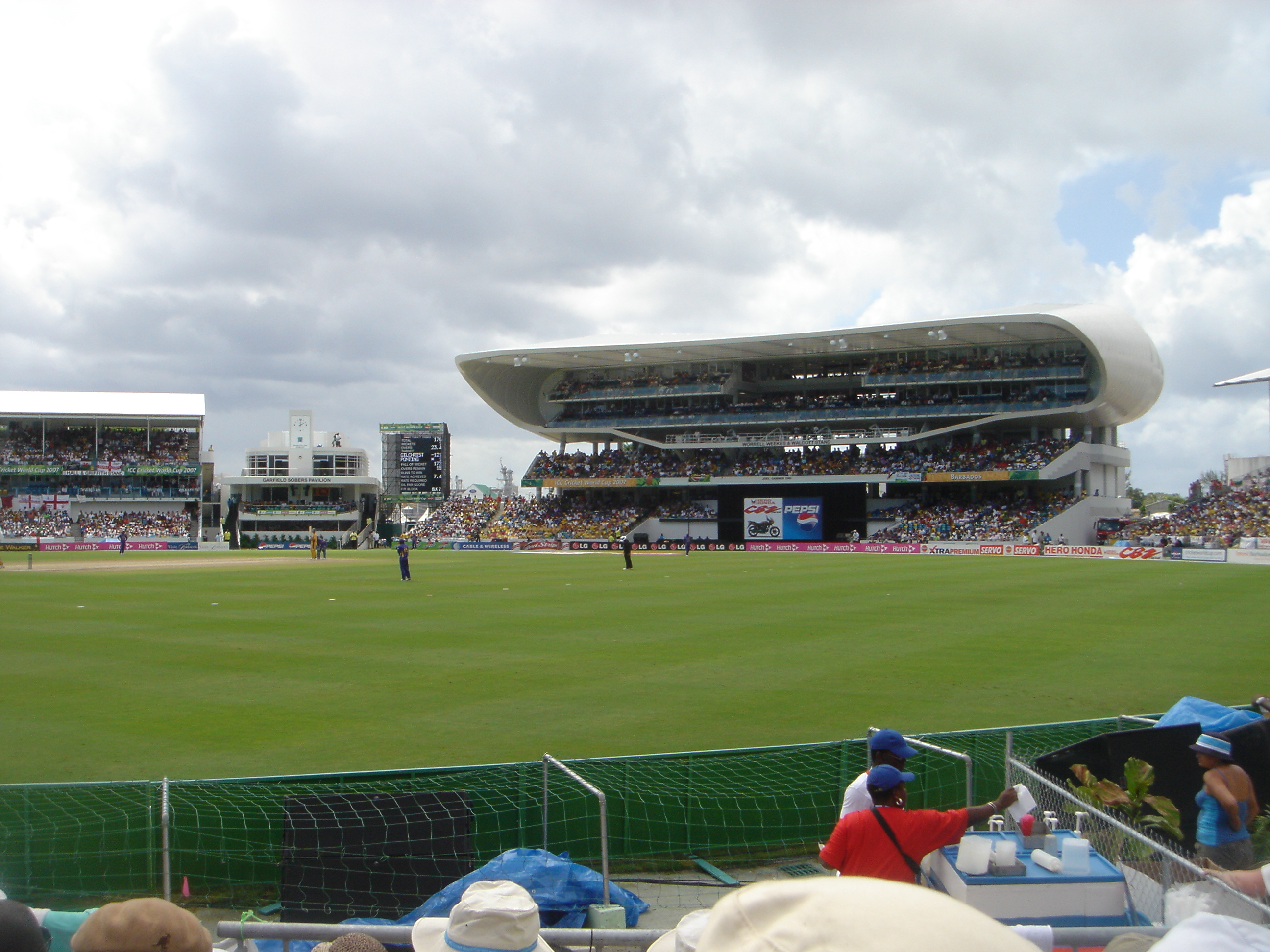
Kensington Oval by Arup Associates and CEP

- Heritage Award for Buildings: St Pancras railway station, High Speed 1 - The RLE Consortium (Arup, Bechtel, Halcrow, Systra)
- Heritage Award for Infrastructure: Westminster Bridge Fascia Replacement Project - Hyder Consulting and Tony Gee & Partners
- Award for Pedestrian Bridges: The Living Bridge, Limerick - Arup
- Award for Transportation Structures: Roadway Bridge Across the Lockwitz Valley - Leonhardt, Andra und Partner
- Award for Commercial or Retail Structures: Heathrow Terminal 5 - Arup
- Award for Education or Healthcare Structures: Thomas Deacon Academy - Buro Happold
- Award for Community or Residential Structures: Casa Kike - Tall Engineers Ltd
- Award for Sports Structures: Beijing National Aquatics Centre - Arup and CCDI
- Award for Arts, Leisure or Entertainment Structures: O2 Arena - Buro Happold
- Award for Industrial or Process Structures: not awarded
- David Alsop Sustainability Award: not awarded
- Award for Small Projects: Spire of Hope, St Annie's Cathedral, Belfast - Ramboll

Commendations

- For Heritage Buildings: Household Cavalry Museum, Horse Guards, Whitehall, London, England - Gifford
- For Pedestrian Bridges: Tri Countries Bridge, Well am Rhein, Germany - Leohardt, Andra und Partner
- For Transportation Structures: Fabian Way Bridge, Swansea, Wales - Flint & Neill
- For Commercial or Retail Structures: BBC W1 Phase 1, London, England - Ramboll
- For Education or Healthcare Structures: The University Town Library, Shenzhen, China - Shenzhen General Institute of Architectural Design & Research
- For Sports Structures: Kensington Oval, Barbados - Arup Associates with CEP
- For Industrial or Process Structures: The Solera Factory, Valencia, Spain - Webb Yates
- For Sustainability: 55 Baker Street, London, England - Expedition Engineering

==== 2007 ====
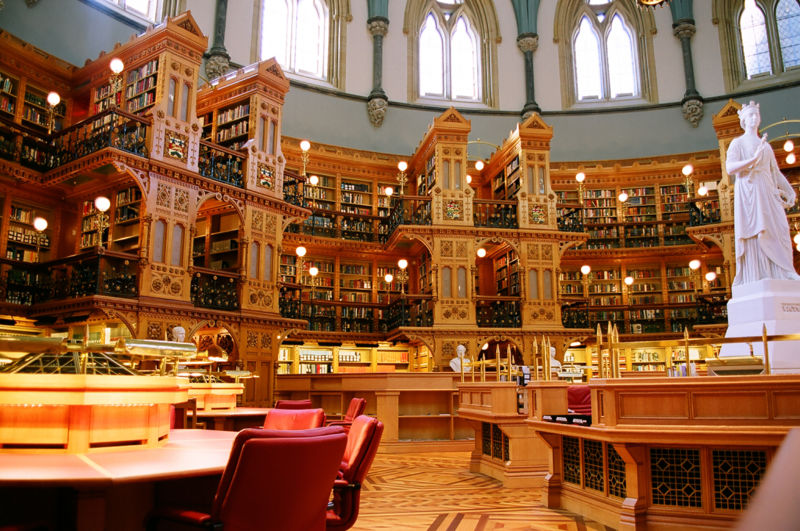
The Library of Parliament by Adjeleian Allen Rebeli Ltd

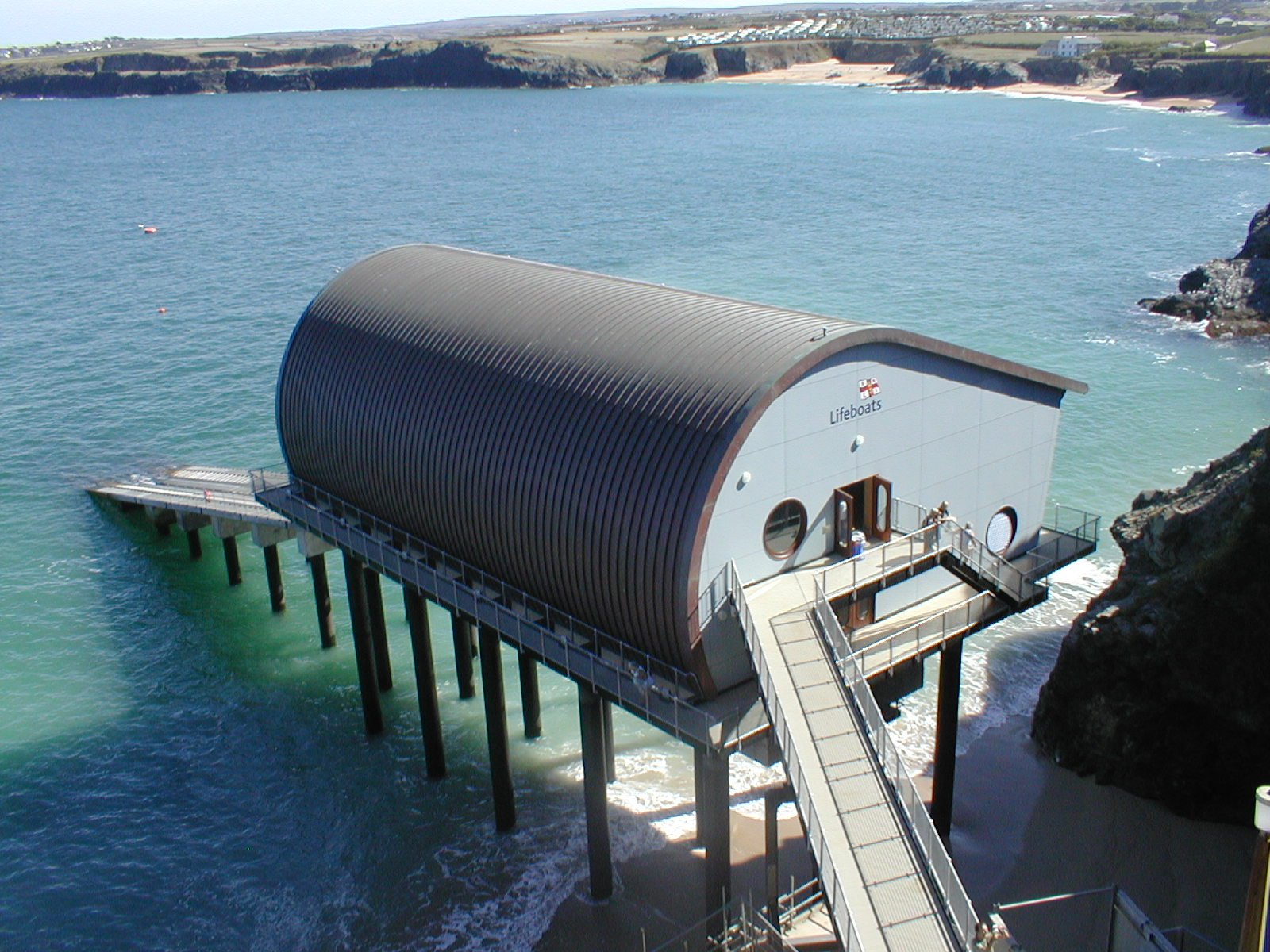
The new Padstow lifeboat station, by John Martin Construction Ltd and Royal Haskoning Ltd

- Heritage Award for Buildings: The Library of Parliament, Canada - Adjeleian Allen Rubeli Ltd
- Heritage Award for Infrastructure: Dresden Hauptbahnhof - Buro Happold and Schmitt Stumpf Frühauf and Partner (Munich)
- Award for Pedestrian Bridges: Nescio Bridge, Amsterdam - Arup and Grontmij, Lelystad
- Award for Transportation Structures: Sheppey Crossing - A249 to Sheerness - Cass Hayward and Capita Symonds
- Award for Commercial or Retail Structures: The New Beijing Poly Plaza - Skidmore, Owings & Merrill
- Award for Education or Healthcare Structures: Teaching and Research Complex of Tongji University - Architectural Design & Research Institute of Tongji University
- Award for Community or Residential Structures: New Life Boat Station RNLI Padstow - John Martin Construction Ltd and Royal Haskoning Ltd
- Award for Sports Structures: The Emirates Stadium - Buro Happold
- Award for Arts, Leisure or Entertainment Structures: The Savill Building - Buro Happold and Engineers Haskins Robinson Waters
- Award for Industrial or Process Structures: The Diamond Synchrotron - Jacobs Engineering Group
- David Alsop Sustainability Award: Adnams Distribution Centre - Faber Maunsell
- Award for Small Projects: Pines Calyx Centre - Scott Wilson incorporating Cameron Taylor

Commendations

- For Heritage Buildings: Baskerville House, Birmingham, England - Buro Happold
- For Heritage Infrastructure: St Pancras railway station Underground redevelopment, London, England - Arup
- For Transportation Structures: Wadi Abdoun Bridge, Amman, Jordan - Dar Al-handasah Consultants
- For Community or Residential Structures: York House, Hong Kong - Maunsell Structural Consultants
- For Sports Structures: University of Phoenix Stadium, Phoenix, Arizona, United States - Walter P Moore
- For Arts, Leisure or Entertainment Structures: Auckland War Memorial Museum Redevelopment, Auckland, New Zealand - Holmes Consulting Group
- For Sustainability: Pines Calyx Centre, Dover, England - Scott Wilson Group incorporating Cameron Taylor
- For Small Projects: Achray Bridge. Wales - Forestry Commission - Civil Engineering

==== 2006 ====
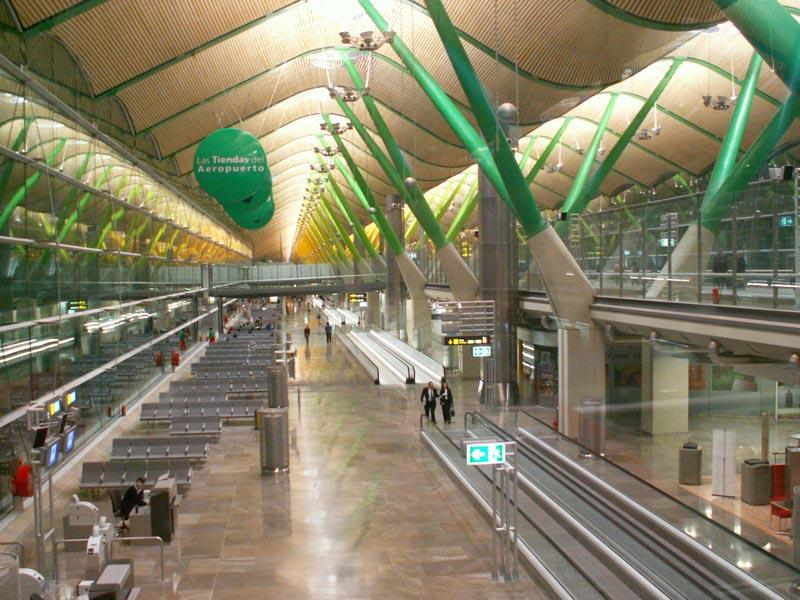
New Terminal 4 Interior, by Anthony Hunt Associates & TPS

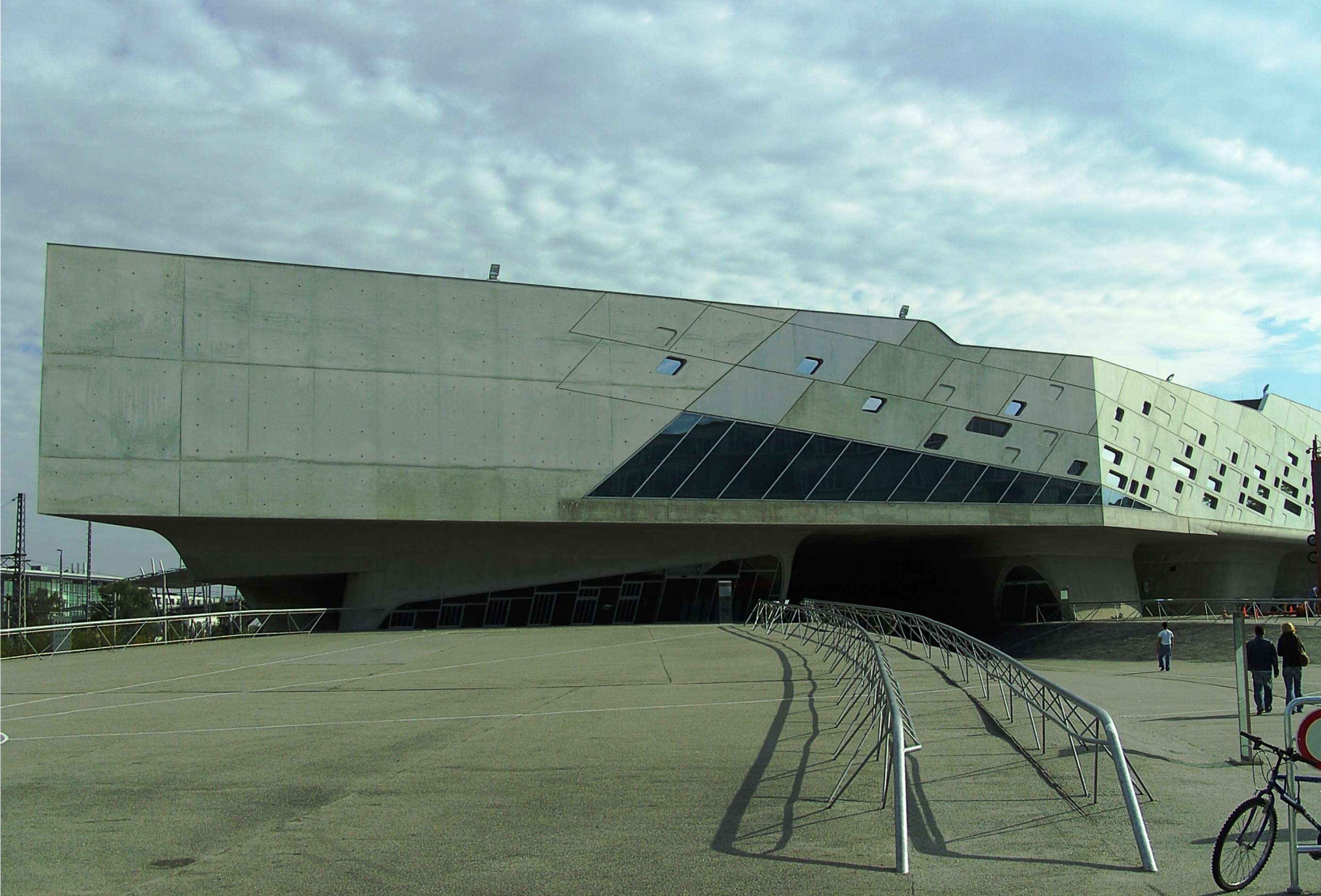
Phaeno Science Centre by Adams Kara Taylor

- Heritage Award for Buildings: Somerset House Floor Stiffening - Alan Baxter & Associates
- Heritage Award for Infrastructure: SS Great Britain - Fenton Holloway
- Award for Pedestrian Bridges: Sean O'Casey Pedestrian Bridge - O'Connor Sutton Cronin
- Award for Transportation Structures: Sungai Prai Bridge - Dar Al-Handasah Consultants
- Award for Commercial or Retail Structures: New Terminal and Satellite Buildings at Madrid Barajas Airport - Anthony Hunt Associates (now SKM) & TPS
- Award for Education or Healthcare Structures: Evelina Children's Hospital - Buro Happold
- Award for Community or Residential Structures: The Hub, Regent's Park - Price & Myers Consulting Engineers
- Award for Sports Structures: Lingotto Speed Skating Oval - Buro Happold
- Award for Arts, Leisure or Entertainment Structures: Phaeno Science Centre - Adams Kara Taylor
- Award for Industrial or Process Structures: Astra Honda Motor New Plant - PT Gistama Intisemesta
- David Alsop Sustainability Award: Shenzhen Western Corridor - Arup
- Award for Small Projects: not awarded

Commendations

- For Heritage Buildings: Skyways Project, Liverpool, England - Curtins Consulting
- For Pedestrian Bridges: Whitemud Creek Arch Bridge, Edmonton, Alberta, Canada - Associated Engineering
- For Transportation Structures: The Paddington Bridge Project, London, England - Cass Hayward
- For Commercial or Retail Structures: St Paul's Hotel, Sheffield, England - Buro Happold
- For Commercial or Retail Structures: Langham Place, Hong Kong - Ove Arup & Partners
- For Commercial or Retail Structures: The Grand Gateway, Shanghai, China - Maunsell Structural Consultants
- For Education or Healthcare Structures: The Manchester Interdisciplinary Biocentre, Manchester, England - Faber Maunsell
- For Community or Residential Structures: Moho, Manchester, England - Joule Consulting Engineers
- For Arts, Leisure or Entertainment Structures: Spinnaker Tower, Portsmouth, England - Scott Wilson Group
- For Sports Structures: Allianz Arena, Munich, Germany - ArupSport
- For Sports Structures: Khalifa Stadium, Doha, Qatar - Arup
- For Sustainability: Waters' Edge Country Park Visitor & Business Centre, Lincolnshire, England - Furness Partnership

==== 2005 ====
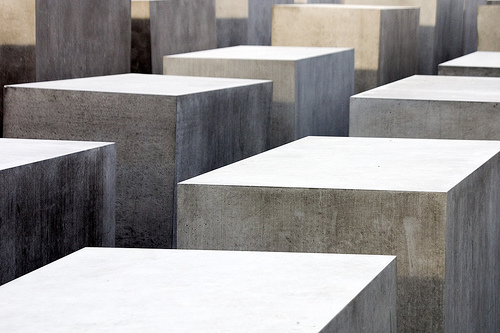
Memorial to the Murdered Jews of Europe by Buro Happold

In 2005, the following awards were made:

- Structural Special Award (two awards):
  - Whitby Bird for Mossbourne Community Academy, London, England
  - Buro Happold for Greenside Place Bridge, Edinburgh, Scotland
- Structural Special Commendation: Arup for the Airside Centre, Zurich Airport, Zurich, Switzerland
- Structural Achievement Award (two awards):
  - Arup for Gatwick Airport Bridge, Surrey, England
  - Buro Happold for the Memorial to the Murdered Jews of Europe, Berlin, Germany
- Structural Achievement Commendation: Gifford for Brading Roman Villa, Isle of Wight, England
- David Alsop Award: Gifford for Carlton House Studios, Hampshire, England
- David Alsop Commendation: Buro Happold for the Nomadic Museum, New York, USA
- Structural Heritage Award (two awards):
  - Arup for the Moat revetment and ramp at the Tower of London, London, England
  - Buro Happold for the New refectory, Norwich Cathedral, Norfolk, England
- Structural Heritage Commendation: Structwel Designers and Consultants PVT Ltd for Ganesh Hall and Darbar Hall of Rajwada, Indore Madhya Pradesh, India

==== 2004 ====
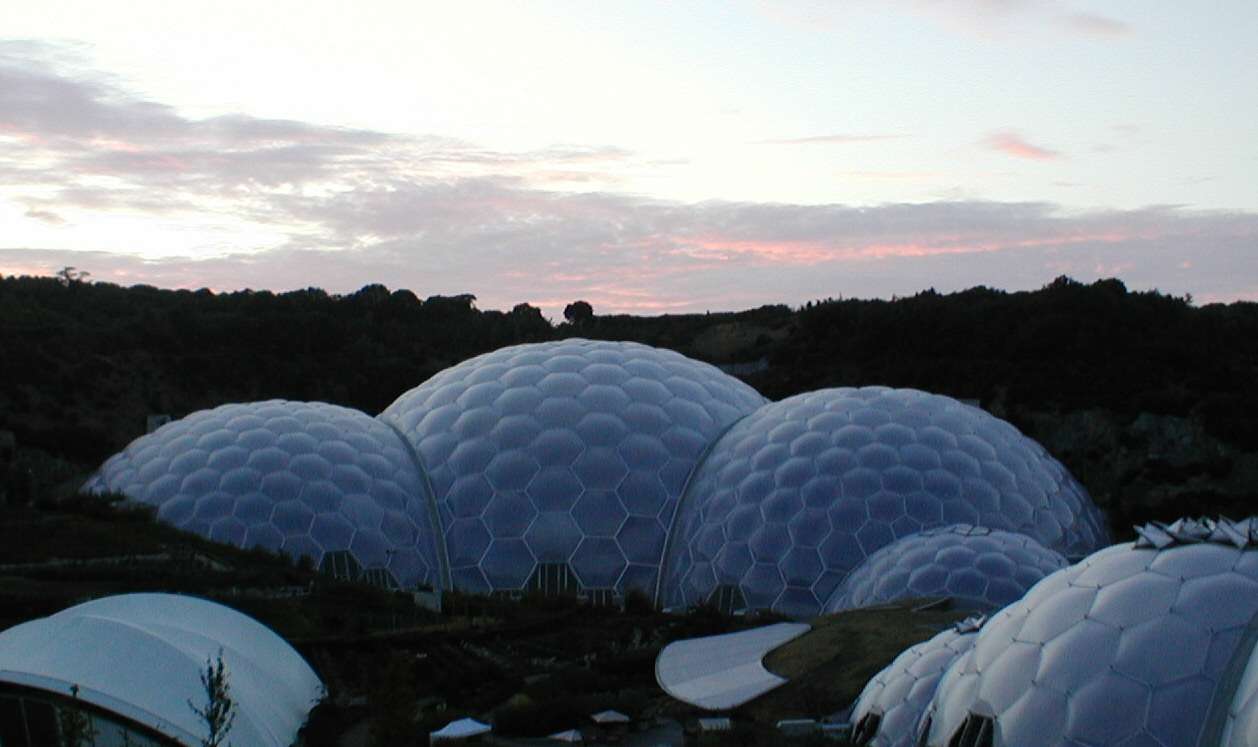
Eden Project by SKM Anthony Hunts

In 2004, the following awards were made:

- Structural Special Award (three awards):
  - Building Design Partnership for Umoja House, Dar es Salaam, Tanzania
  - Fluid Structures for Glass Extension, Private House, London, England
  - Fast + EPP for Central City Timber, Surrey, British Columbia, Canada
- Structural Special Commendation: Buro Happold for New Hangar, TAG Farnborough Airport, Hampshire, England
- Structural Achievement Award: Africon for Pungwe River Bridge, Mozambique
- Structural Achievement Commendation: WSP Cantor Seinuk for Golden Jubilee Bridges, London, England
- David Alsop Award: Faber Maunsell for 1 South Gyle Crescent, Edinburgh, Scotland
- David Alsop Commendation: SKM Anthony Hunts for Eden Foundation Building - Cornwall, England
- Structural Research and Development Award: Buro Happold for Mechtenberg Brücken - Gelsenkirchen, Germany
- Structural Heritage Commendation: Opus International Consultants for Seismic Strengthening/Refurbishment of Historic Chief Post Office, Auckland, New Zealand

==== 2003 ====
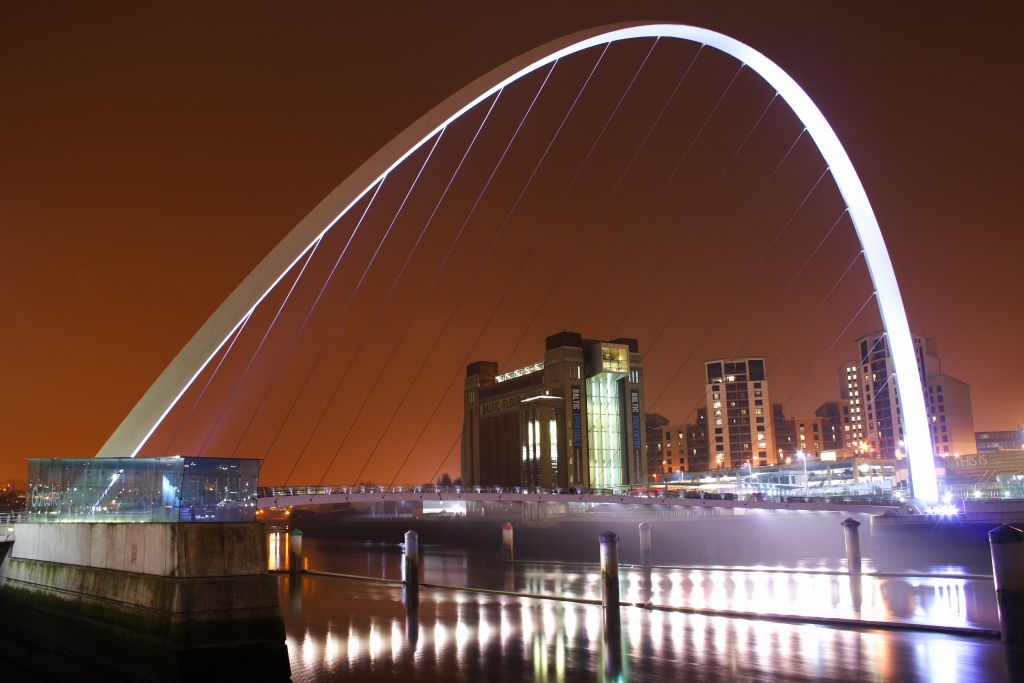
Gateshead Millennium Bridge by Gifford

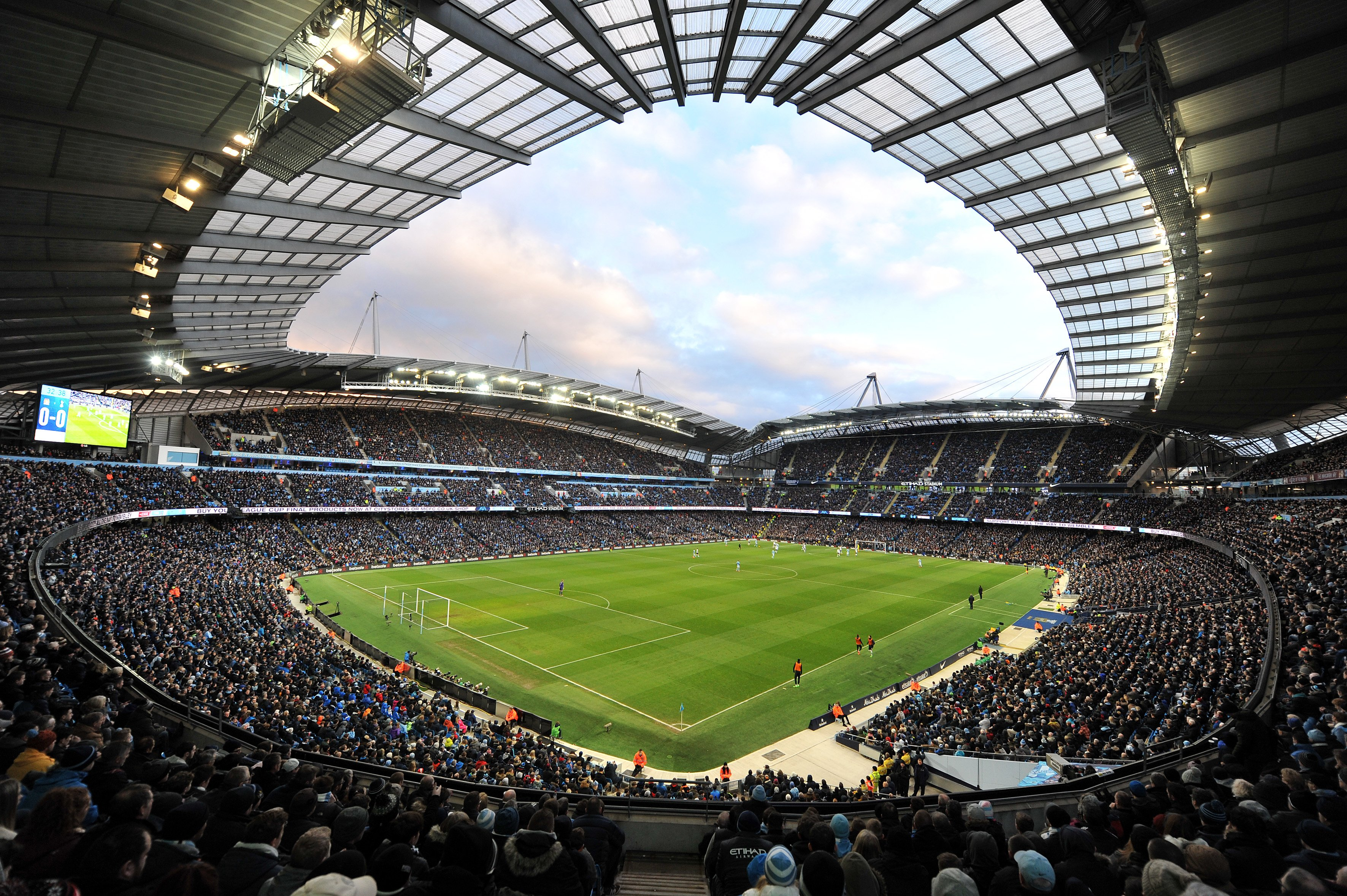
City of Manchester Stadium by Arup Sport

- Structural Special Award:
  - Gifford for the Gateshead Millennium Bridge, Gateshead, England
  - Arup Associates for the City of Manchester Stadium, Manchester, England
- Structural Achievement Award:
  - Dewhurst Macfarlane & Partners with Goldreich Engineering for the Kimmel Center for the Performing Arts, Philadelphia, USA
  - Hyder Consulting for the Tamar Bridge Strengthening and Widening, Plymouth, England
- Structural Achievement Commendation:
  - Fast & Epp for Brentwood Town Centre station, Vancouver, British Columbia, Canada
  - Faber Maunsell for the Recital Room, Royal Academy of Music, London, England
- Structural Research & Development Award: Arup for the London Millennium Bridge, London, England
- Structural Heritage Commendation:
  - White Young Green for The Light, Leeds, England
  - Peel & Fowler for The Redhouse Cone, Stourbridge, England
- David Alsop Commendation: Buro Happold for the Weald and Downland Gridshell, Singleton, England

==== 2002 ====
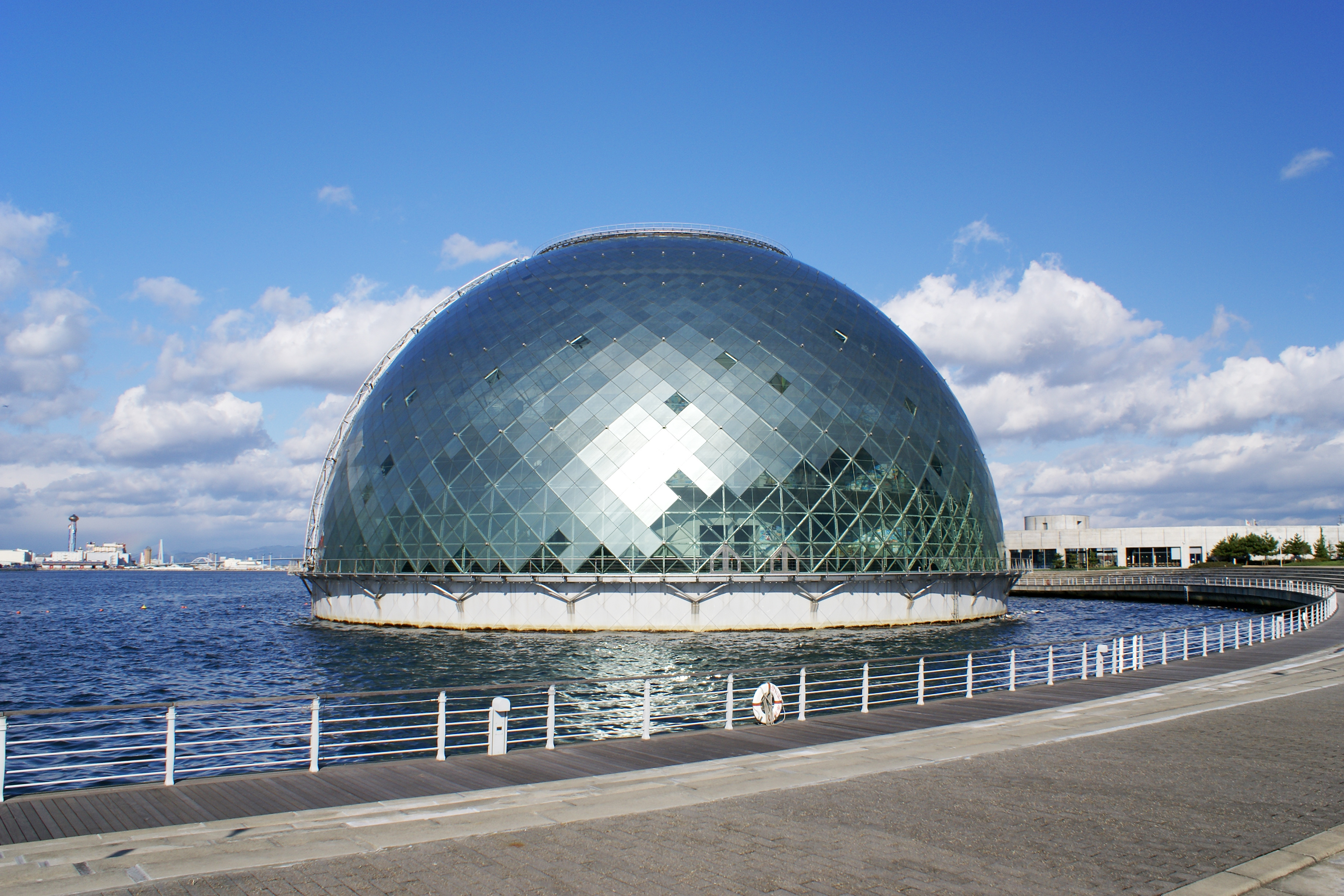
Osaka Maritime Museum by Ove Arup & Partners

In 2002, the following awards were made:

- Structural Special Award (three awards):
  - Anthony Hunt Associates Ltd and Mero (UK) for The Eden Project, Cornwall, England
  - Ove Arup & Partners for Osaka Maritime Museum Dome, Osaka, Japan
  - Buro Happold for the Queen Elizabeth II Great Court, British Museum, London, England
- Structural Achievement Award:Buro Happold for the Japan Pavilion, Expo 2000, Hanover, Germany
- Structural Achievement Commendation: Buro Happold for the Glasgow Science Centre Tower, Glasgow, Scotland
- Structural Heritage Award: WSP Group for the redevelopment of Knightsbridge Crown Court for Harrods, London, England
- Structural Heritage Commendation (three awards):
  - Oscar Faber for Liverpool Lime Street railway station, England
  - Arup Consulting Engineers for the Guinness Storehouse Guinness Brewery, Dublin, Ireland
  - Wright Consulting Engineers for the Church of Assumption of Our Lady, Hartwell, Aylesbury, England
- David Alsop Award: Buro Happold for Wessex Water Operations Centre, Bath, England
- David Alsop Commendation: Whitby Bird & Partners for Toyota Manufacturing UK headquarters, Epsom, England

==== 2001 ====
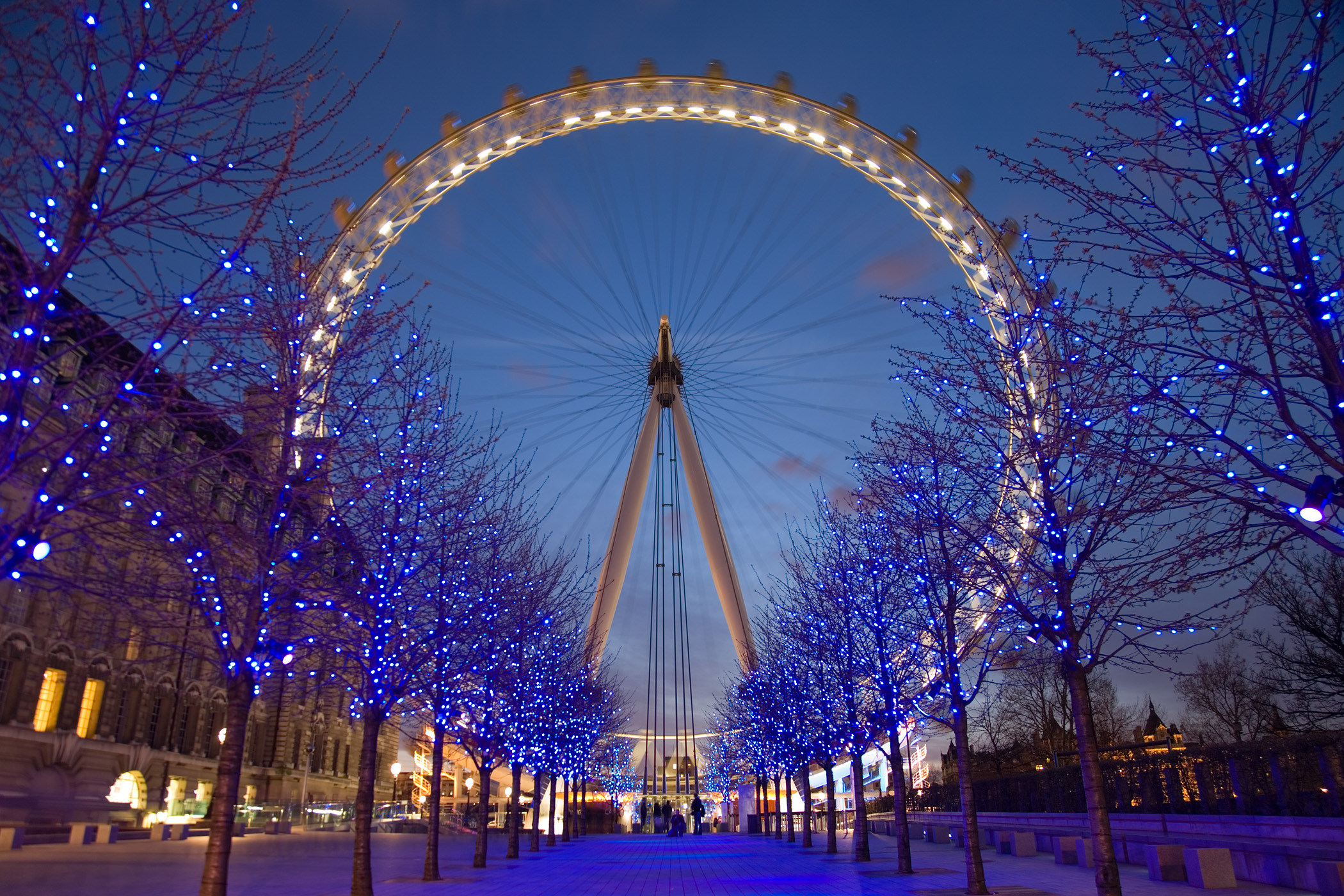
London Eye by Babtie Allott & Lomax and Hollandia

In 2001, the following awards were made:

- Structural Special Award: Babtie Allott & Lomax and Hollandia for the London Eye
- Structural Special Commendations:
  - Price & Myers for the Millennium Bridge, Dublin, Ireland
  - WS Atkins Consultants for the Millennium Stadium, Cardiff, Wales
  - Hyder Consulting for the Emirates Towers, Dubai, United Arab Emirates
- Structural Achievement Awards:
  - Arup GmbH for the Cargo Lifter Airship Hangar, Brand, Germany
  - Hyder Consulting for the strengthening of the M5 Avonmouth Bridge, England
- Structural Achievement Commendation: WS Atkins Consultants for the Glass Walls, Korean Trade Centre, Seoul, South Korea
- Structural Heritage Award: Price & Myers for the Royal Court Theatre, London, England
- Structural Heritage Commendation: Oscar Faber for The Triangle, Manchester, England
- David Alsop Awards:
  - WSP Group for the Sainsbury's Millennium Store, Greenwich, London, England
  - Ove Arup & Partners for Portcullis House, Westminster, London, England

==== 2000 ====
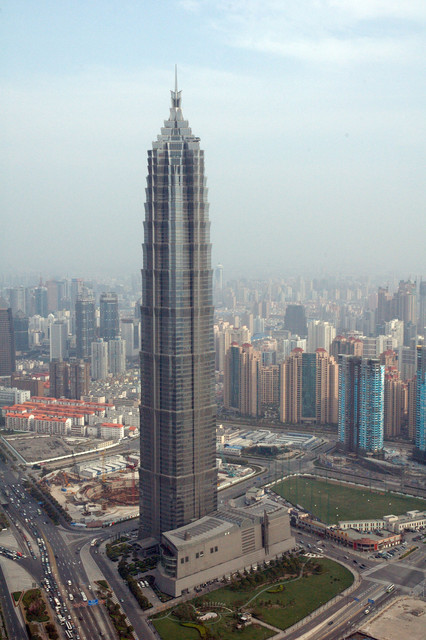
Jin Mao Tower by SOM

In 2000, the following awards were made:

- Structural Special Awards:
  - WS Atkins for the Burj Al Arab, in Dubai, United Arab Emirates
  - Buro Happold for the Millennium Dome in London, England
  - Modus Consulting Engineers for Stadium Australia, Sydney, Australia
  - Hyder Consulting for Stratford railway station Concourse, London, England
  - Skidmore, Owings & Merrill for the Jin Mao Tower, Shanghai, China
- Structural Achievement Awards:
  - Ove Arup & Partners for the Natwest Media Centre at Lord's Cricket Ground, London, England
  - Flint & Neill Partnership for Lockmeadow Bridge, Maidstone, England
  - WSP Group for Canning Town station, London, England
- Structural Achievement Commendations:
  - Skidmore, Owings & Merrill for the Lisbon Multi-Use Arena, Portugal
  - Ove Arup & Partners for the grandstand at Lord's Cricket Ground, London, England
- Structural Heritage Award: Building Design Partnership for Neptune Court redevelopment, National Maritime Museum, Greenwich, England
- Structural Heritage Commendation: Oscar Faber for Oxford Road railway station, Manchester, England

== See also ==
- List of engineering awards
