= Flint & Neill =

British engineering firm

Flint & Neill Limited - now COWI UK Limited
- Type: Limited Company
- Industry: Engineering
- Founded: 1958
- Founder: Flint & Neill founded by Tony Flint, Tony Neill
- Headquarters: United Kingdom & Worldwide
- Area served: Worldwide
- Key people: David MacKenzie, Lars Hauge
- Services: engineering consulting, Construction management
- Parent: COWI A/S
- Website: www.cowi.com

Flint & Neill is a firm of consulting civil and structural engineers based in the United Kingdom. Flint & Neill was established as an engineering consultancy in 1958, and specialises mainly in the design, analysis, construction and maintenance of bridges, although they do also provide structural engineering services for other structures including buildings.

The firm is a subsidiary of the Danish COWI Group, and forms part of their Bridge, Tunnel and Marine Structures Division. On 1 January 2017, Flint & Neill rebranded as COWI.

== History ==
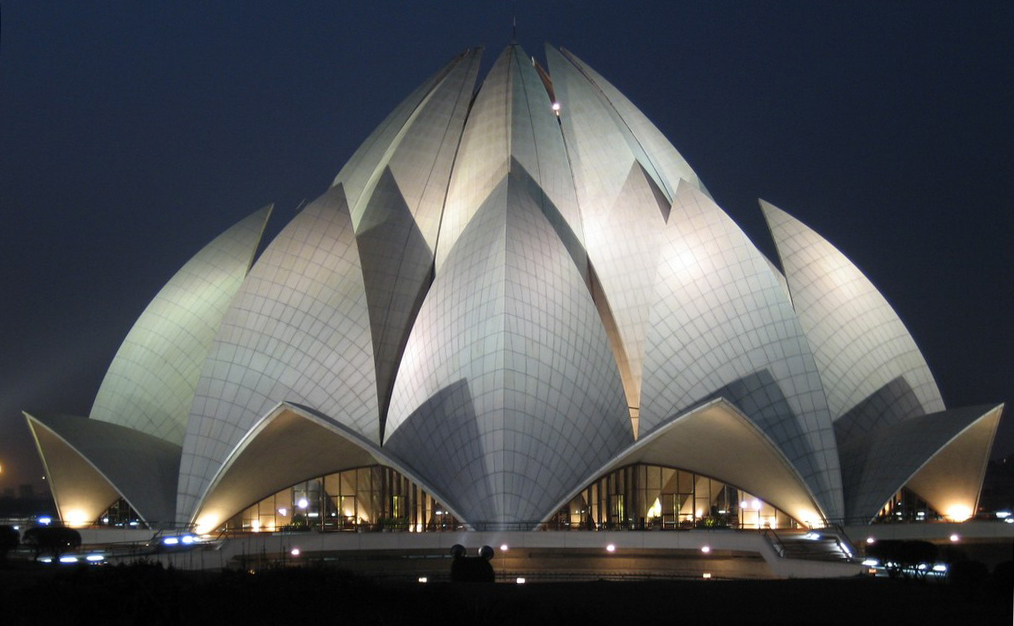
Lotus Temple

Flint & Neill was formed in 1958 as a partnership by Tony Flint and Tony Neill. In December 2008, the firm was bought by COWI, a Danish consulting engineering firm, and became a limited company.

In January 2017, Flint & Neill merged with Donaldson Associates to form COWI UK Limited.

=== Partners/Directors ===
- 1958 – 1978 Partners: A.R. Flint, J.A. Neill
- 1978 – 1981 Partners: A.R. Flint, J.A. Neill, B.W. Smith
- 1981 – 1990 Partners: A.R. Flint, B.W. Smith
- 1990 – 1997 Partners: B.W. Smith, J.E. Evans, I.P.T. Firth
- 1997 – 2002 Partners: J.E. Evans, I.P.T. Firth, D.K.MacKenzie
- 2002 – 2008 Partners: I.P.T. Firth, D.K.MacKenzie
- Present Directors: D.K.MacKenzie, I.P.T. Firth, J.D. Cutter, R.A. Percy, E.J. Rees, P.A. Sanders, H. Wood

== Notable projects ==
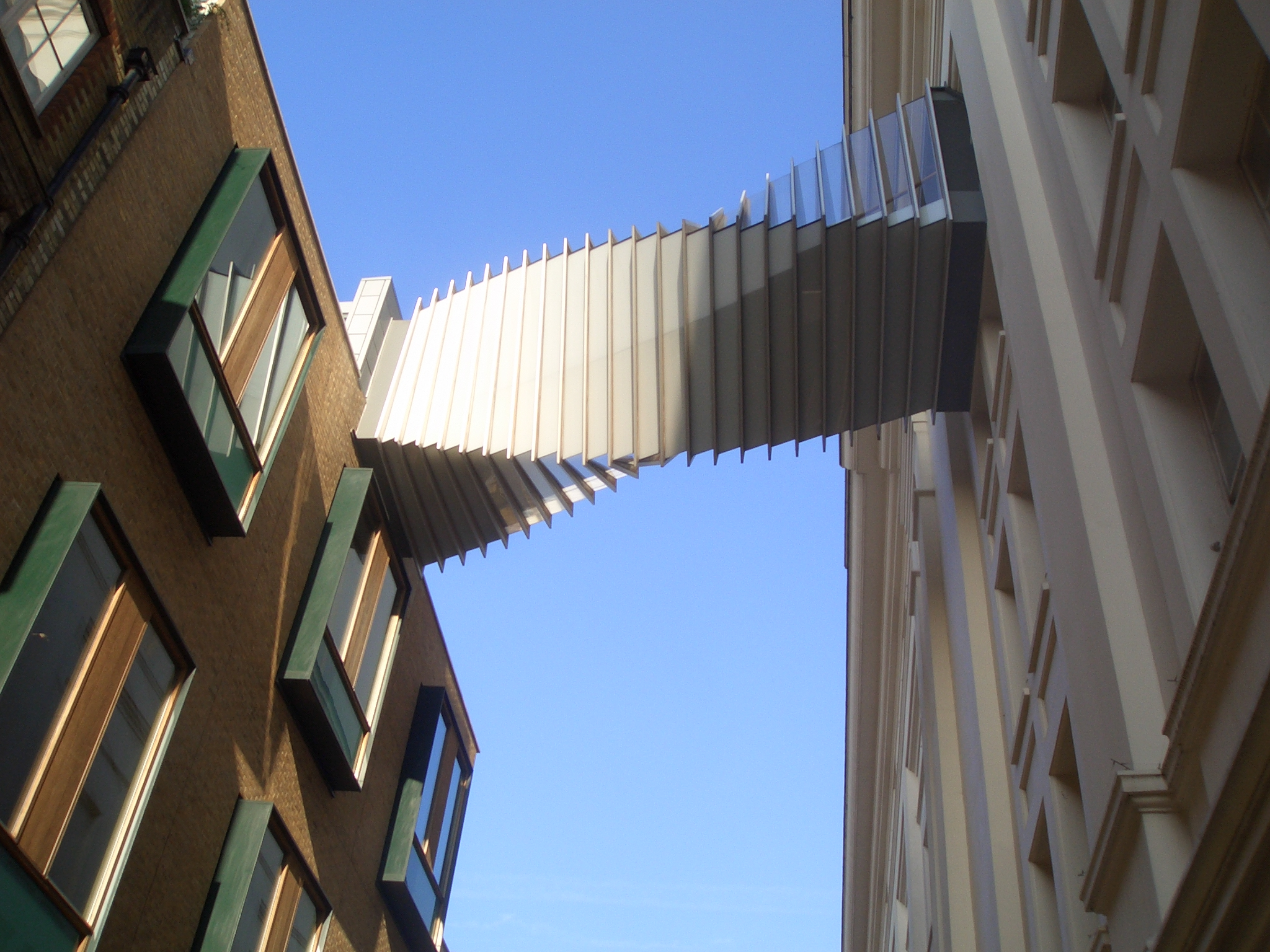
Bridge of Aspiration

- Severn Bridge Strengthening
- Royal Ballet School Bridge of Aspiration
- West Gate Bridge Strengthening, Melbourne, Australia
- National Theatre, London.
- Baha'I Lotus Temple, New Delhi, India
- Strait of Messina Bridge, Italy
- Swansea Sail Bridge, Wales
- Compiègne Bridge, France
- Hinterrhein Bridge, Reichenau / Tamins, Switzerland

== Awards ==
2017

The Institution of Structural Engineers presented COWI UK Limited with the Award for Vehicle Bridges for Destructor Bridge, Bath during their Structural Awards ceremony. The Inner Harbour Bridge, Copenhagen was shortlisted in the Pedestrian Bridges category.

2015

The Institution of Structural Engineers presented Flint & Neill with two awards during their Structural Awards ceremony: Schuman Bridge won the Award for Highway or Railway Bridge Structures and Greenwich Reach Swing Bridge won the Award for Pedestrian Bridges.

The British Construction Industry Awards awarded The Temporary Works Award to the QEII Bridge Joint Replacement Project, for which Flint & Neill were principal designers.

2014

The M48 Wye Bridge Expansion Joint Rocker Arm Replacement won the ICE Wales Cymru Project Award.

2013

The Saints Stadium Bridge, St Helens, United Kingdom was awarded a Commendation for High Standard of Design Achieved at The British Constructional Steelwork Association's Structural Steel Design Awards.

Castle Green Bridge was given the Award for Infrastructure (Small Firm) at the ACE Engineering Excellence Awards. The project also received a Commendation at The Structural Awards, in the Small Projects category.

2012

The firm, together with Sinclair Knight Merz, won the Institution of Structural Engineers Supreme Award in 2012 for the West Gate Bridge Strengthening project. The same project also won several other awards in the United Kingdom and Australia.

The Bridge of Aspiration at the Royal Ballet School in Covent Garden in London won a 2004 RIBA Award.
