= Gifford (company) =

British company

- Company type: LLP
- Industry: Construction and business services
- Founded: 1951
- Headquarters: Southampton, Hampshire, England, United Kingdom, Australia, UAE
- Key people: Gordon Clark, (Chairman); Steve Canadine, (Chief Executive)
- Revenue: £41.7 million (2007)
- Operating income: £4.5 million (2007)
- Net income: £3.9 million (2007)
- Number of employees: 657
- Website: Ramboll Group

Gifford & Partners is a British firm that provides engineering consultancy, design, planning, project management and consulting services for buildings, infrastructure and the environment. It is part of the Ramboll Group.

== History ==
The firm was founded by Edwin Gifford, a pioneer of prestressed structures, in Southampton in 1951 under the name E.W.H. Gifford & Partners. It won the Queen's Award for Enterprise in 2002.

In March 2011, Gifford was bought by the consulting engineering company Ramboll.

== Operations ==
The firm has activities focused on:

- Buildings
- Civil Engineering
- Environment Development Planning

It has offices in:

- Birmingham
- Cardiff
- Chester
- Leeds
- London
- Manchester
- Oxford
- Southampton
- Australia
- York
- Abu Dhabi
- Episkopi (Cyprus)
- Dubai
- Gibraltar
- New Delhi

== Notable projects ==
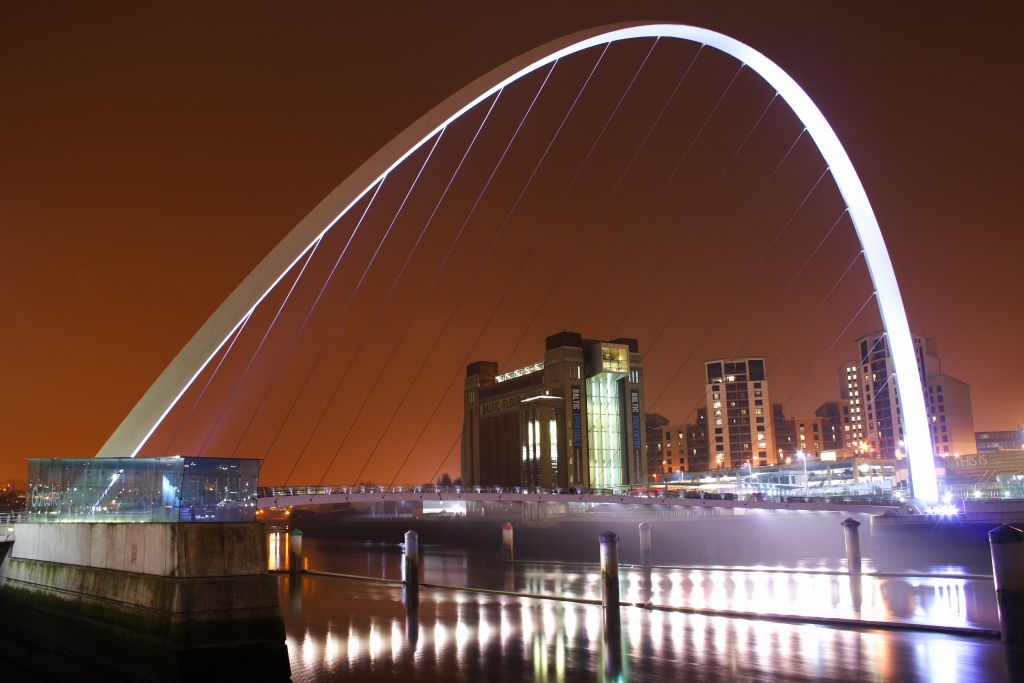
View of the bridge by night from the Newcastle side

- Gateshead Millennium Bridge, Gateshead, UK, for which it won the IStructE Supreme Award for engineering excellence and the RIBA Stirling Prize
- Brading Roman Villa, Isle of Wight, UK
- Forthside Bridge, Stirling, UK
- M25 motorway widening, London, UK
- Juan Pablo II Bridge, Chile
- Hungerford Bridge Footbridges, London, UK
- Twin Sails bridge, Poole, UK
