= Brock Commons Tallwood House =

Wooden student residence at UBC in Canada

- Brock Commons Tallwood House in 2026

General information
- Status: Completed
- Location: 6088 Walter Gage Road, Vancouver, Canada
- Coordinates: 49°16′10″N 123°15′4″W
- Construction started: November 2015
- Topped-out: August 2016
- Opened: July 2017
- Cost: $51.5 million
- Owner: University of British Columbia

Height
- Height: 53 metres (174 ft)

Technical details
- Floor count: 18
- Floor area: 15,120 square metres (162,800 sq ft)
- Lifts/elevators: 2

Design and construction
- Architecture firm: Acton Ostry Architects
- Structural engineer: Fast + Epp

Other information
- Number of rooms: 305

Website
- vancouver.housing.ubc.ca/residences/brock-commons/

Brock Commons Tallwood House is an 18-storey student residence at the Point Grey Campus of the University of British Columbia (UBC) in Canada. At the time it was opened, it was the tallest mass timber structure in the world.

It is the first phase of a complex at Brock Commons. The Brock Hall Annex located at the site will be demolished to make way for a building in phase 2. The 1958 mosaic mural "Symbols of Education" by Lionel and Patricia Thomas, commissioned by the university's 1958 graduating class, will be moved as a result.

== Construction ==
The long elevation, seen from the roof of a neighbouring parkade

It was built via the Tall Wood Building Demonstration Initiative (TWBDI) of Natural Resources Canada that in October 2017 led to the establishment of the Green Construction Through Wood (GCWood) program. Acton Ostry Architects designed the building with structural engineering firm Fast + Epp, which received consultation services from Architekten Hermann Kaufmann of Vorarlberg, Austria, for tall-wood construction. Before raising the building, a two-storey 8-by-12-metre (26 ft × 39 ft) mock-up was built on site to test wood-to-wood connections and the stability of the structure.

Site construction began in November 2015, and topped out in August 2016. Construction of the structure and facade began in June 2016 and was completed by a work crew of nine individuals in 57 days, rising at a rate of about 2 floors per week. The construction team described the assembly procedure to be "like Lego".

The building was subject to the 2012 British Columbia Building Code, which limits wood buildings to six storeys. This necessitated a special approval, as well as two structural reviews. The first review, completed by Merz Kley Partner ZT GmbH of Dornbirn, Austria, focussed on the timber structure. The second was a seismic review conducted by Read Jones Christoffersen Consulting Engineers of Vancouver.

The project cost $51.5 million to complete, and was designed to satisfy LEED Gold standards.

== Description ==
Facade panels between window columns

The 53-metre-tall (174 ft) building has a capacity to house 404 students, primarily for graduate and upper-year undergraduate students, with a floor space of 15,120 square metres (162,800 sq ft). It consists of 33 four-bedroom units, 272 studios, study spaces, and lounges. The top floor is devoted to a lounge.

The frame is built of pre-fabricated engineered timber manufactured by Penticton-based Structurlam, and the structure also consists of a concrete foundation and steel components. The floors above grade are made of five-ply cross-laminated timber, anchored to the glulam columns using steel connectors. The latter were used to comply with the 2015 National Building Code seismic design requirements. The roof is steel-framed, composed of pre-fabricated steel beams supporting a metal deck. The structure is anchored by two concrete cores spanning its height for lateral stability that also function as the staircases for the building.

The wood structure is panelled with drywall, chosen to satisfy fire safety codes and more quickly obtain municipal permit approvals.

== Legacy ==
As a result of TWBDI and the structure's construction, amendments to the 2020 and 2025 National Building Code of Canada were proposed to permit the construction of tall wood buildings. The British Columbia building code was amended in March 2019 to allow the construction of mass timber frame buildings of up to 12 storeys.

The building is fitted with accelerometers, inclinometers, moisture meters, and vertical shortening string potentiometers. The data collected will be analyzed by a research team at UBC to determine the building's performance relative to its design.
