= Grandview Heights Aquatic Centre =

Aquatic centre in Surrey, Canada

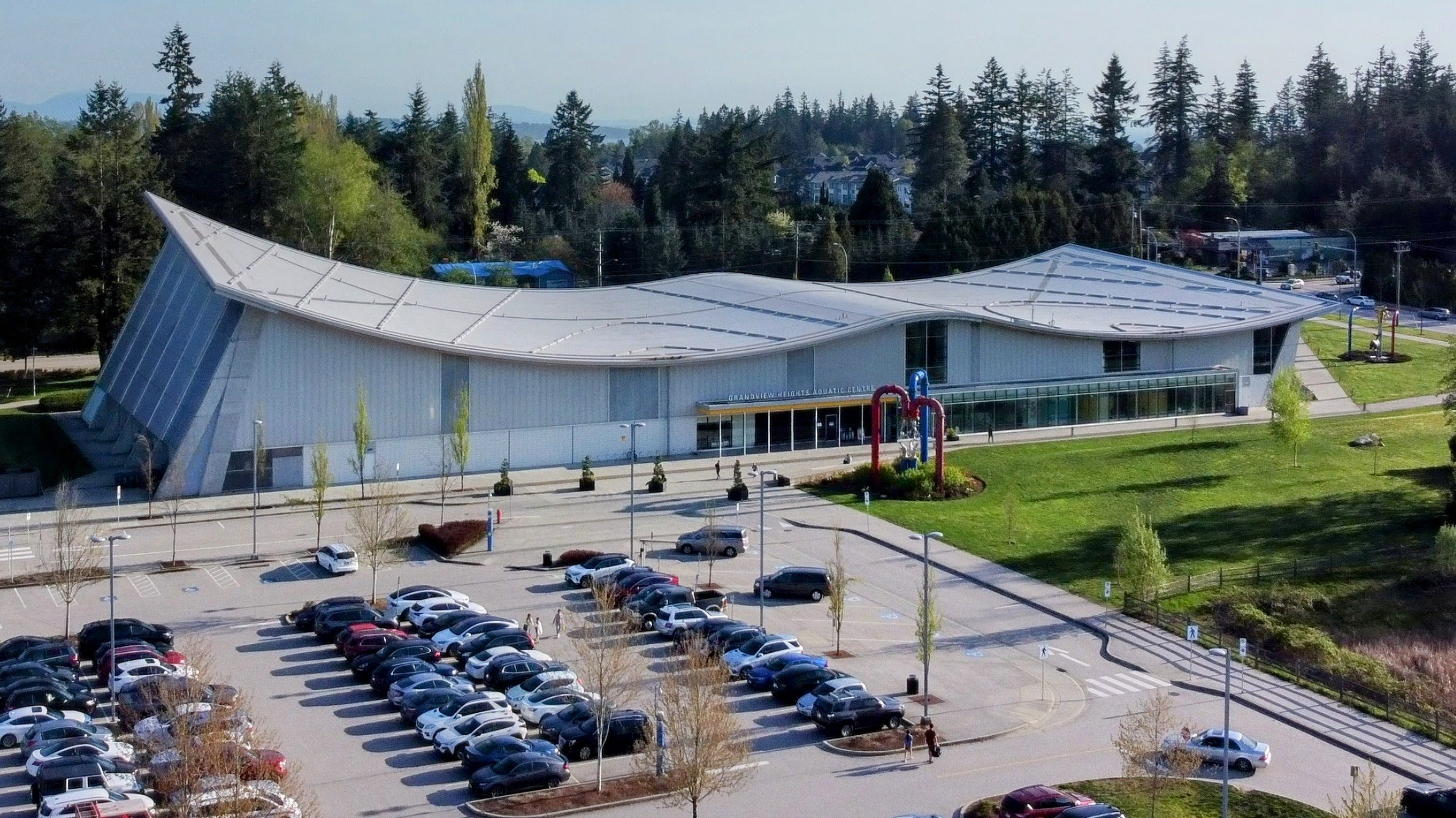
- Aerial view looking southwest
- Interactive map of Grandview Heights Aquatic Centre
- Location: 16855 24 Ave, Surrey, BC, V3S 0A2
- Coordinates: 49°02′46″N 122°45′20″W
- Owner: City of Surrey
- Dimensions: Approx. 99,500 square feet (9,240 m^{2}); Length: 50 metres (164 ft); Width: 25 metres (82 ft); Depth: 5 metres (16 ft)

Construction
- Opened: June 11, 2016
- Cost: $55 million
- Architect: HCMA Architecture + Design

Website
- City of Surrey

The Grandview Heights Aquatic Centre (GHAC) is an indoor Olympic-sized aquatic centre in Surrey, British Columbia, Canada. It is located in the Grandview Heights neighbourhood of South Surrey, and was designed by HCMA Architecture + Design, built at a cost of $55 million and opened in June 2016. The facility features a 10-lane 50-meter lap pool, leisure pool with lazy river, hot tubs, diving towers and a water slide in addition to a sauna and steam room.

== History ==
The plans for the Grandview Heights Aquatic Centre were first announced in 2012 with a series of public open houses hosted by the City of Surrey in conjunction with Stuart Rothnie, architect for HMCA Architecture + Design. The facility was originally planned to begin construction in fall 2012 and be completed by summer 2014.

The opening of the facility was delayed in November 2015 by weeks due to a leaking air pipe in the leisure pool that was discovered during construction. This delay pushed the project's expected completion date to March 2016. Prior to this delay, the facility was scheduled to open in January 2016.

The Grandview Heights Aquatic Centre had a soft opening in March 2016 and a grand opening on June 11, 2016.

Typically, facilities of this size have a warranty maintenance closure of approximately two to six weeks; Grandview had its warranty closure beginning on August 29 and ending on October 3, 2016.

== Facility ==
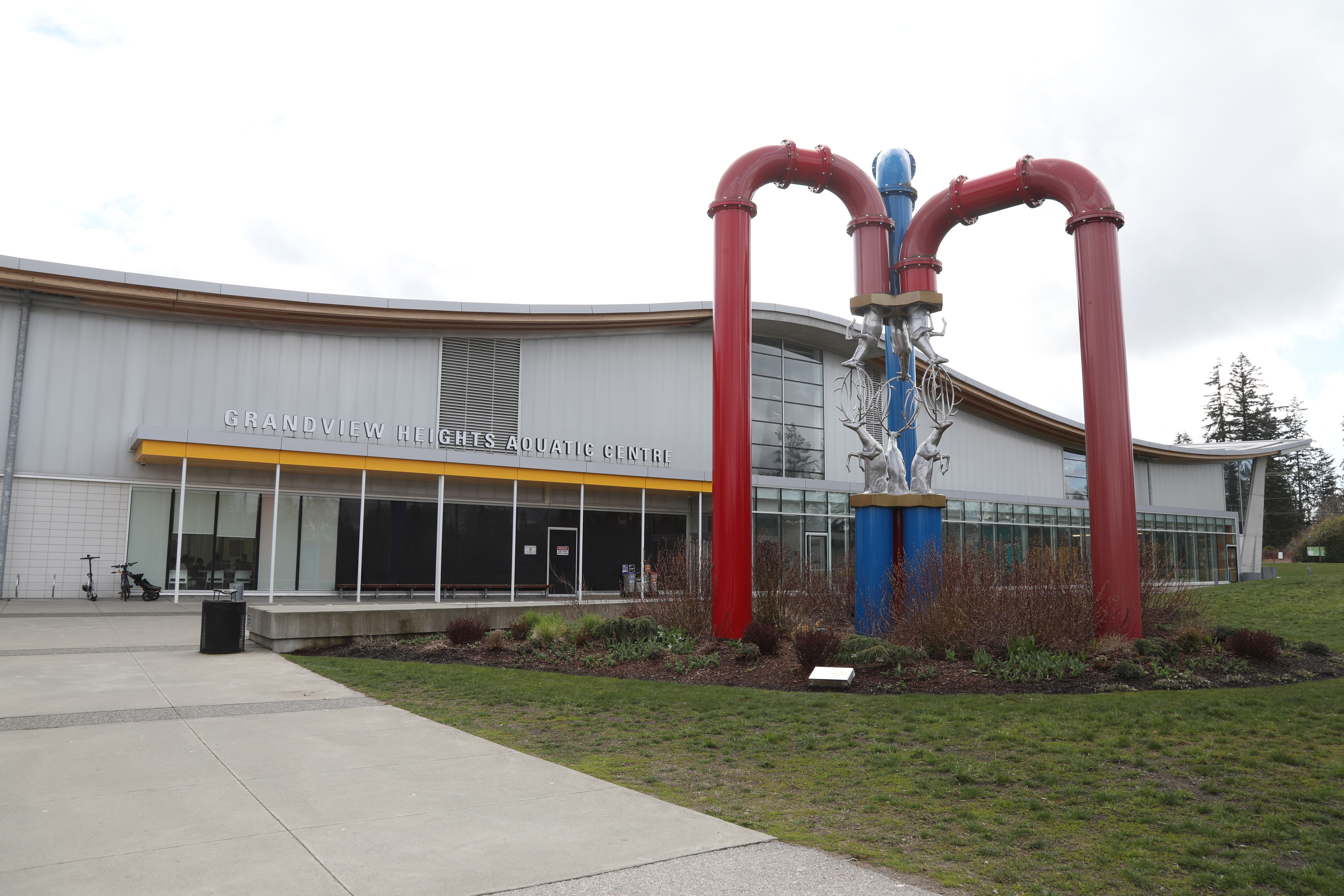
Main entrance to the facility

The facility, sized at an approximate 99,500 square feet (9,240 m^{2}), has an open concept lobby featuring a cafe and classroom with male, female and unisex changing rooms on the ground floor, with the 7,000 square feet (650 m^{2}) fitness centre above.

The natatorium includes an Olympic-size swimming pool, a leisure pool, a family hot tub and separate adult hot tub, a water slide, and a steam room and sauna in addition to numerous other water features. The natatorium's viewing area and additional pool deck has seating for up to 900 spectators.

The main pool is a 10-lane competition lap pool with a length of 50 metres (160 ft) and width of 20 metres (66 ft), featuring a movable floor in the shallow end and two movable floating bulkheads that allow the facility to accommodate a variety of activities. As the lap pool has a full set of boards and platforms up to a height of 10 metres (33 ft), the deepest part of the main pool is 5 metres (16 ft). The movable floor, with a length of 12.5 metres (41 ft) and width of 20 metres (66 ft), is reported to be the largest movable floor in British Columbia. The main pool was built to FINA standards, ensuring that it can host competitive events.

The leisure pool is approximately 500 square feet (46 m^{2}), with an embedded lazy river as well as spray features, a small water slide and play features.

== Design ==
Grandview Heights Aquatic Centre has a unique timber roof system that spans 88 feet (27 m) in length. The roof presents an "undulating" pattern enforced by steel cables and lengths of Douglas fir. It claims the title of the world's longest spanning timber catenary roof.

== Awards ==
The aquatic centre has been received numerous provincial, national and international awards for its architecture. The awards include:

- The Lieutenant-Governor of British Columbia honored the facility with the Medal in Architecture (Merit level) at the 2016 Architectural Institute of British Columbia Awards Ceremony held on May 19, 2016.
- The facility was recognized at the World Architecture Festival as the World's Top Completed Sport Building in 2016.
- The Institution of Structural Engineers gave the facility the Supreme Award for Structural Engineering Excellence, the institute's highest award, as well as the Award for Community or Residential Structures at the 2016 Structural Awards in London, England on November 11, 2016.
- The facility was presented the Schreyer Award & Award of Excellence at the 2016 Canadian Consulting Engineering Awards in October 2016 for demonstrating "technical excellence and innovation".
- The National Council of Structural Engineers Associations recognized the facility in 2016 as an outstanding project for the Excellence in Structural Engineering Awards in the New Buildings $30 to $100 Million category.
- The facility was recognized in November 2016 at the 6th Annual Fraser Valley Commercial Building Awards, winning the category of Community Recreational.
