= Oscar Faber =

British engineer (1886–1956)

Oscar Faber CBE MICE MIMechE (5 July 1886 – 7 May 1956) was a British structural engineer. He was influential in the development of the use of reinforced concrete in the United Kingdom. Because many engineers were not certain of the material, Faber pioneered simple deflection tests, which enabled him to develop his theory of "Plastic yield in concrete", and to calculate shear in reinforced concrete beams.

Faber was born in London, the son of the Danish Commissioner of Agriculture in London. His work for Trollope & Colls on non-magnetic mine casings during the First World War earned him the OBE in the 1918 Birthday Honours.

He set up as an independent consultant at the age of 35 in 1921, with £2000 capital, in Finsbury Circus, City of London. The firm comprised 2 engineers, an office junior and a typist. This was to grow to become Oscar Faber and Partners.

Notable projects include the Bank of England, the House of Commons, Africa House and India House in London. He co-authored the book, Reinforced Concrete Design, with P.G. Bowie, which became a standard work. Faber's work on rebuilding the House of Commons won him a CBE in 1951. He also worked on the Snow Hill, Bath, re-development scheme – 11-storey block of 56 maisonettes opened by Alderman Sam Day in March 1958 – in association with architects Snailum, Huggins and Lefevre.

Faber was president of the Institution of Structural Engineers between 1935 and 1936. The Institution named an award after him, the Oscar Faber Medal, one of which was presented to Fazlur Khan in 1973.

Faber's company Oscar Faber & Partners eventually merged with G Maunsell & Partners to become Faber Maunsell. In 2009, Faber Maunsell was rebranded AECOM.
