= Hickson & Welch =

Former chemical company of the United Kingdom

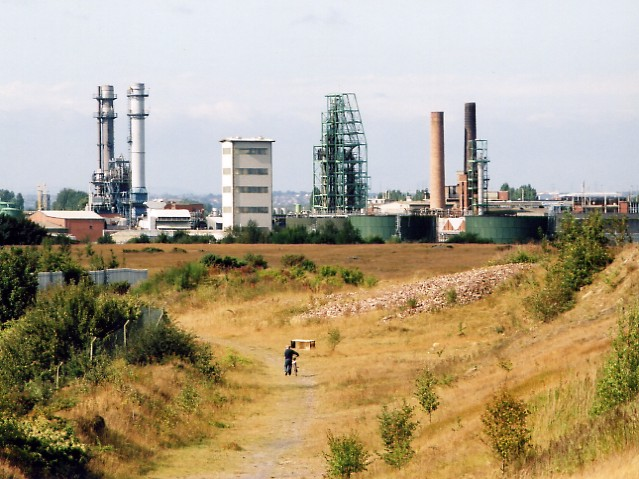
- Former site seen in 2007
- Type: Private Limited with share capital (00499821)
- Industry: Chemicals
- Founded: 7 November 1931
- Founder: Bernard Hickson, Colbeck Welch
- Fate: Closed in July 2005
- Successor: Hickson International plc
- Headquarters: Wheldon Road, Castleford, WF10 2JT 53.73°N 1.34°W
- Area served: Worldwide
- Products: DDT, timber preservatives
- Number of employees: c.1,300
- Website: www.hicksonandwelch.co.uk

Hickson & Welch was a British chemicals company based in Castleford. Whilst the firm was operating in Castleford, it was beset by three separate explosions in 1926, 1930, and 1992. The company was sold to Arch Chemicals in 2000, and the site was closed six years later. At one point during the 20th century, it was the UK's largest producer of DDT.

== History ==
Ernest Hickson had founded a company in 1893 to introduce sulphur black (a sulphur dye) to the British cotton industry. In 1915 Hickson & Partners Ltd was founded.

=== Foundation ===
In 1931 Hickson & Welch Ltd was founded, from the site that had been destroyed in 1930.

From 1944 the company made DDT, becoming the UK's largest manufacturer.

Hickson and Welch (Holdings) Ltd was incorporated on 28 September 1951. It made dyestuffs, DDT (pesticide), and timber preservatives. It had the subsidiaries Hickson & Welch Ltd, and Hickson's Timber Impregnation Co. (G.B.) Ltd. The timber subsidiary had been founded on 25 October 1946. The timber preservative contained dinitrophenol, and was marketed as Triolith, Tanalith and Pyrolith. Pyrolith contained a flame-proofing agent.

=== Public company ===
It became a public company on 30 November 1951. The company became known as Hickson International from 1985. Bernard Hickson was chairman and managing director in the 1950s until 1968.

In August 1991 it sold William Blythe of Lancashire for £23 million to Holliday of Huddersfield.

It bought Angus Fine Chemicals for £22.3 million in July 1992.

=== Closure ===
In August 2000 Hickson International plc was bought by Arch Chemicals. At the time Hickson employed over 1,300 people, had assets of £73 million, and a revenue of £208 million.

It was rebranded as C6 Solutions and closed in July 2005. The gas fired power station was demolished in 2021. To the east was Wheldale Colliery, and opposite the site is The Jungle rugby league ground; Castleford is synonymous with rugby league.

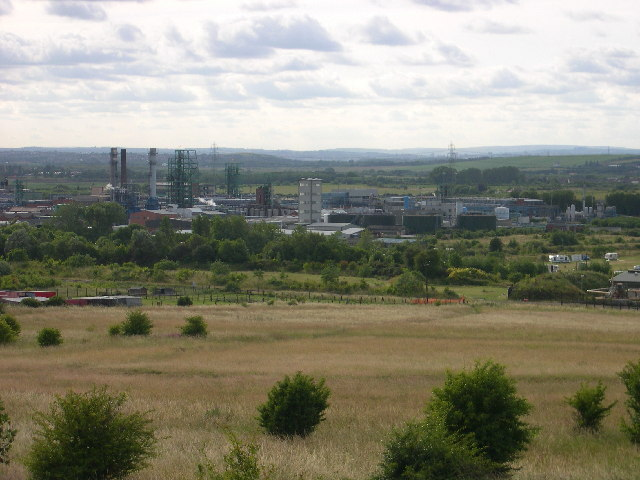
The site, looking north, in July 2004

== Explosions ==
=== 1926 explosion ===
In November 1926 an explosion occurred while workers were packing an intermediate dye, thought to be non-explosive. Two men died.

=== 1930 explosion ===
On 4 July 1930, just before noon, there was an explosion on the site's nitration plant. It destroyed the factory, killing 13 people and injuring 32 people. It made 300 houses in the town uninhabitable. Ernest Hickson later died (natural causes, 30 July 1930) and his earlier company was liquidated. Inspector J.A.Gee of the Castleford West Riding Police, was subsequently appointed an OBE by HM George V, for his work following the explosion.

=== 1992 explosion ===
On Monday 21 September 1992, an explosion at the factory killed five workers, and injured around two hundred people. At 13.20 a distillation column still base containing residues of nitrotoluene ignited. The 200ft jet fire went through the site's control room and killed two men instantly. The fireball then entered a four-storey office block; a woman and two men died from their injuries later. The explosion cost £3.5 million.It made schools in the area shut down.

A nearby traffic warden made the first emergency call at 1.22pm. The ambulances took the first of the injured at 1.46pm, to the A&E at Pontefract General Infirmary.

54 year old George Potter, of Broadmead, Castleford, had two sons, and six grandchildren. 38 year old David Wilby, of Rookhill Mount, Chequerfield, Pontefract, was married with a son and daughter. Both died instantly.

18 year old Sara Atkinson had been at the factory for only five weeks, from Hallfield Avenue in Micklefield, on a six-month attachment; she was found slumped in a second-floor office block toilet, being found by the firemen at 2.03pm. When being airlifted to Pinderfields Hospital, she had a heart attack, caused by the asphyxiation from so much smoke inhalation, whilst in the West Yorkshire Police helicopter. She had been put on a life-support machine in the coronary care unit, and had not recovered. The machine was switched off on Thursday 24 September at 2.15pm, in consultation with her parents.

Most of the staff in the four-storey office building had gone elsewhere for their lunch, at the time of the explosion.

Three other people were in the control room, where the two men had died instantly from the intense heat. Process technician 42 year old John Hopson, a father of two from Lumley Street in Castleford, had 45% burns. Manufacturing controller 29 year old Neil Gaffeney, of Birch Grove, Townville, Castleford, married with a child, had 58% burns. Both were on ventilators in the regional burns unit of Pinderfields, and never survived. But team leader 55 year old Terry Douthwaite was also in the burns unit, with less severe injuries, and did survive. Neil Gaffeney had the artificial respirator turned off on Saturday 26 September. John Hopson died three weeks later on 12 October.

Around 100 fire service personnel tackled the blaze, with 22 appliances from Castleford, Pontefract and Normanton. Ten of these personnel were put in an isolation ward of Pinderfields Hospital, with effects of cyanosis affecting their fingers (blue fingers). Another nine fire service personnel were in a non-isolation ward of the same hospital and Dewsbury and District Hospital, with symptoms of chemical poisoning. 181 people suffered from nausea and vomiting. 28 rescue staff were treated for diarrhoea and nausea.

The health investigation was led by Dr Alison Evans, the public health director of Wakefield Health Authority, and Dr Sally Pearson and Dr Virginia Murray of National Poisons Unit. This poisoning was looked at by the Employment Medical Advisory Service, and the National Poisons Unit (medical toxicology unit) at Guy's Hospital in London. The vomiting was later traced to polluted water, and the norovirus.

It went to court on Friday 30 July 1993, and the company was fined £250,000 with £150,000 costs. The families had wanted charges of manslaughter, but the CPS said that there was not enough evidence.

== Structure ==
The site was next to the River Aire in Castleford Ings, in the north of Castleford, accessed from the A6032/A656 roundabout. The site was 163 acres. Eight hundred people were employed on the Castleford site.

=== Power station ===
Powergen (now E.ON UK) installed a £30 million CHP gas turbine power station at the site. ENEL Power built the power station, which had a 44MW General Electric LM6000 engine. The generation equipment was built by Nuovo Pignone. It had a 13MW steam turbine, with the site producing around 56MW of electricity.

The power station began operations in October 2002. The power station was demolished in 2021.

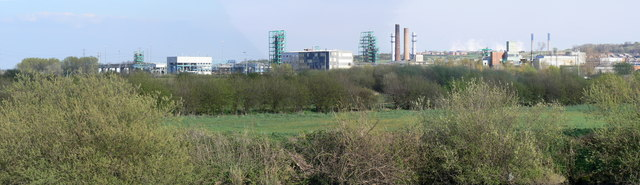
Factory

== Products ==
- Wood protection
- Furniture coatings
- Organic chemicals
