= Imran Ahmad Khan =

Convicted sex offender and former British Conservative politician (born 1973)

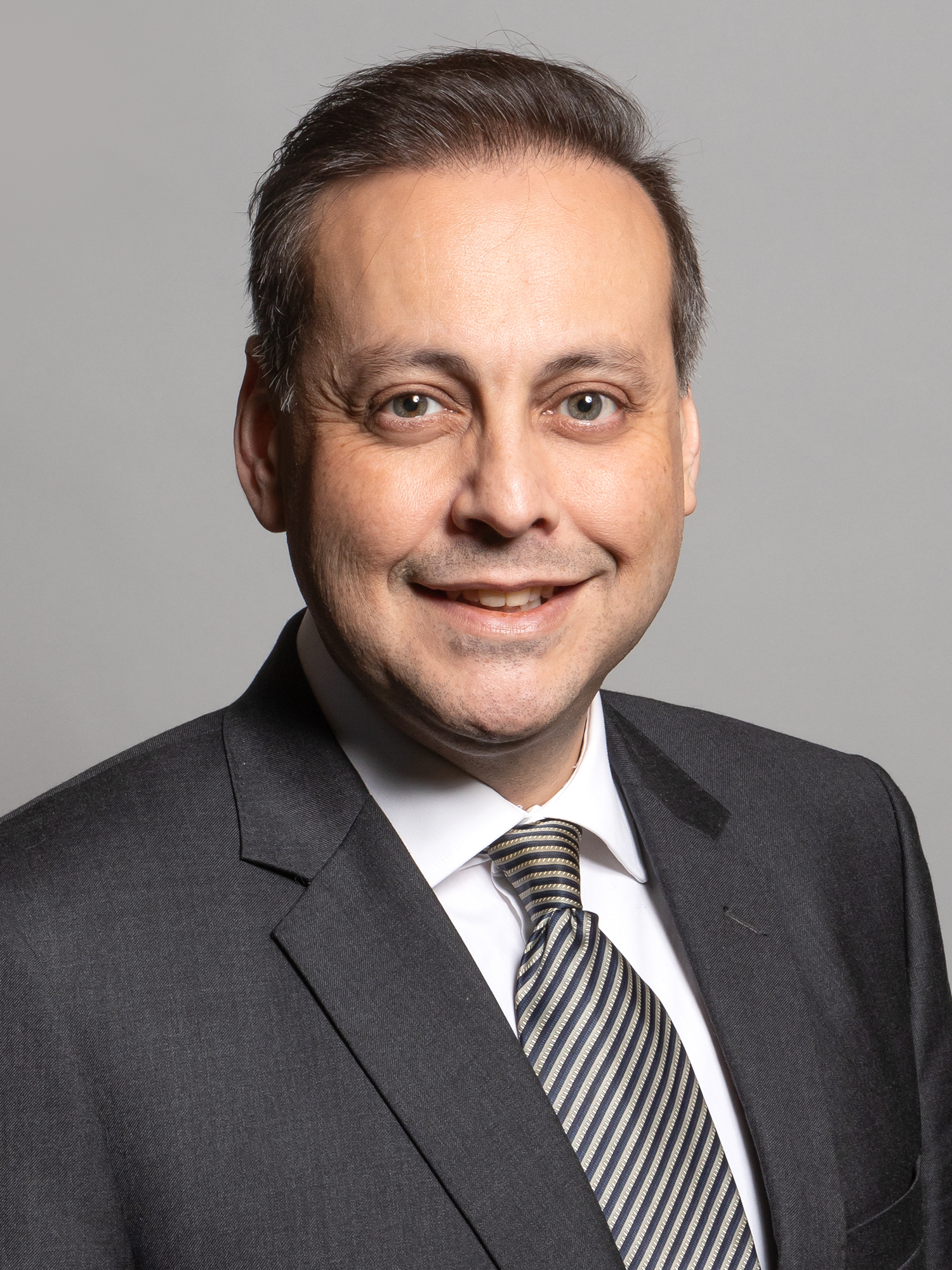
- Official portrait, 2020

Member of Parliament for Wakefield
- In office 12 December 2019 – 3 May 2022
- Preceded by: Mary Creagh
- Succeeded by: Simon Lightwood

Personal details
- Born: Imran Nasir Ahmad Khan; 6 September 1973 (age 53) Dewsbury, West Yorkshire, England
- Party: Independent
- Other political affiliations: Conservative (until 2022, expelled)
- Relatives: Karim Ahmad Khan (brother)
- Education: Silcoates School
- Alma mater: King's College London; Pushkin Institute; Centre International de Formation Européenne
- Criminal information
- Status: Convicted/found guilty
- Conviction: Sexual assault
- Penalty: 18 months in prison

Imran Nasir Ahmad Khan (born 6 September 1973) is a British former politician and convicted child sex offender. He served as Member of Parliament (MP) for Wakefield from 2019 until 2022 as a Conservative, After Ahmad Khan was charged with sexually abusing a child, his party whip was suspended by the party in June 2021, and he became an independent. Following his criminal conviction for child sexual assault, he was expelled by the party in 2022. He served half of his 18-month prison sentence.

He studied at the Pushkin Institute in Moscow and at King's College London. Ahmad Khan worked for the United Nations as special assistant for political affairs in Mogadishu, and as a senior consultant for M&C Saatchi. A supporter of Brexit, he was elected in the 2019 general election, and attributed his victory to voters' support for leaving the European Union in the 2016 referendum.

In 2021, Ahmad Khan was charged under the Sexual Offences Act 2003 with having sexually assaulted a 15-year-old boy in 2008. Ahmad Khan denied the accusation "in the strongest terms". On 11 April 2022, following a two-week-long trial in the Southwark Crown Court, he was convicted of sexually assaulting a minor. He resigned as an MP on 3 May. He was sentenced to 18 months in prison on 23 May, and served nine months before he was released in February 2023.

== Early life and career ==
According to Imran Nasir Ahmad Khan, he was born on 6 September 1973 in Pinderfields Hospital, Wakefield, where both his parents worked. His father, Saeed Ahmad Khan, was born in the North West Frontier Province of British India (now Pakistan), and worked as a consultant dermatologist. His English mother was a state registered nurse and midwife. His maternal grandmother, Joyce Reynolds, also worked at Pinderfields Hospital as a staff sister, and his maternal grandfather was a miner.

His older brother, with whom he is close, is lawyer Karim Ahmad Khan, a KC. His brother worked at the ICC as Prosecutor from 2021 until July 24, 2026, when Members of the ICC voted to remove him amid allegations against him of sexual misconduct.

Ahmad Khan attended the local, private Silcoates School. He studied Russian at the Pushkin Institute in Moscow, briefly attended Leeds University in 1992 at which he started a degree, and earned a bachelor's degree in war studies at King's College London. He worked for the United Nations as a special assistant for political affairs in Mogadishu, and for the advertising agency M&C Saatchi – according to the company, as an external consultant for one month in 2019. Having worked as a counter-terrorism expert prior to becoming an MP, he joked his experience in conflict zones such as Somalia and Afghanistan gave him what would be needed to build bridges between warring parties in the Brexit battle.

== Political career ==
=== Member of Parliament (2019–2022) ===
In the 2019 general election, Ahmad Khan defeated the incumbent Labour MP, Mary Creagh, to become the first Conservative MP for Wakefield in 89 years. Wakefield had voted almost 2-to-1 in favour of leaving the European Union in the 2016 referendum, and was a target seat for the Conservatives. He was selected after the withdrawal of candidate Antony Calvert, whose racist and sexist social media posts were uncovered. Labour's Creagh said: "Will the next candidate they parachute in be any better? Don’t hold your breath." Ahmad Khan responded by literally skydiving over the town and retorted he was "a local lad born and bred in Wakefield, of Wakefield stock. I couldn't figuratively parachute in—and I didn't want to disappoint her—so I decided I would literally parachute in."

In his maiden speech in January 2020, Ahmad Khan spoke of his pleasure of being part of "a vibrant and dynamic pack of Yorkshire MPs". He called for equality of opportunity to be made real, and for more patriotism: "I see perhaps more clearly than most the deep and enduring importance of core British values such as compassion, tolerance and fairness, especially at a time when those values are perceived as under threat in many parts of our world."

==== Reviewing sexual offences against minors ====
Ahmad Khan was part of a panel advising on grooming gangs and the grooming gangs scandal, and contributed to a 2020 paper called "Group-based Child Sexual Exploitation: Characteristics of Offending" at the same time that police were investigating him for child sexual abuse. The Home Office said it was not aware of the allegations against him at the time that he was on the advisory panel. Responding to the disclosures, Labour's shadow cabinet minister, Louise Haigh said,

Khan's victim told the Conservatives about sickening sexual abuse, and they did nothing, and then shamefully appointed him to sit alongside survivors of child sexual exploitation.... The Tories have serious questions to answer over how they gave this man free rein to exploit his position and victims of abuse. Boris Johnson and Priti Patel need to come clean about what the Conservative party knew and how they could possibly have put victims in this horrifying position in the first place.

Activist Sammy Woodhouse, who was targeted, groomed, and abused aged 14, and took part in the review with Ahmad Khan, said,

This was important work that I undertook in good faith, but I am disgusted to have been put in a position where I was working with a man later convicted for child sexual assault. Knowing now that the Conservatives had already received complaints from a victim about this man, it is gut-wrenching for me as a survivor that they could possibly have allowed him to be considered for this role.

==== COVID-19 pandemic response ====
Ahmad Khan organised a shipment of 110,000 reusable face masks through connections with the charity Solidarités international and the Vietnamese Government. Most of the masks were for the Mid Yorkshire Hospitals NHS Trust's Pontefract, Pinderfields and Dewsbury and District Hospitals and 10,000 were distributed by the trust to local care homes and hospices. He launched 'Wakefield Together' to co-ordinate local efforts to tackle difficulties arising from the COVID-19 pandemic.

Ahmad Khan helped secure £2.9 million for Wakefield's art hubs, including Theatre Royal Wakefield, the Creative Art House, and the West Yorkshire Theatre Dance Centre, via the Culture Recovery Fund.

==== Resignation ====
Following his conviction for sexual assault, Ahmad Khan announced on 14 April 2022 that he would be resigning as an MP. On 28 April 2022, he announced he had tendered his letter of resignation, effective from the end of April. He was to receive the entirety of his April salary upon his resignation.

His resignation was effected on 3 May 2022, by his appointment to the Chiltern Hundreds. As a result of this a by-election was held on 23 June, in which Labour recovered the seat.

== Sexual assault conviction ==
=== Charges ===
In June 2021, Ahmad Khan was charged on suspicion of a historical sexual offence of groping a 15-year-old boy, in Staffordshire, in 2008. He denied the accusation. That month, the Conservative Party suspended the whip from Ahmad Khan pending the outcome of the prosecution, meaning he would not be sitting as a Conservative in the Commons.

Ahmad Khan attempted to have the case heard in secret, and ban press reporting on his case. First arguing that, as a serving MP, there were concerns about his safety, and second that naming him in court would breach his human rights, and third that the age of his victim should be withheld. His applications were rejected by Chief Magistrate Paul Goldspring at Westminster Magistrates' Court, who said, in favour of open justice: "Damage to reputation is not a ground for making of an order." Ahmad Khan, an Ahmadi Muslim, unsuccessfully applied to have the case heard anonymously, as the consumption of alcohol and homosexual acts are strictly prohibited in Islam, and claimed that reporting them could expose him to risk for his safety both in the UK and abroad.

=== Trial ===
On 10 September 2021, he pleaded not guilty at London's Old Bailey. The case was transferred to Southwark Crown Court for trial on 21 March 2022 on a single count of sexual assault.

At trial, Ahmad Khan denied accusations that he dragged a 15-year-old boy upstairs, forced the boy to drink alcohol and watch pornography, told him that he was "a good-looking boy," and reached for and groped the boy's groin. Police were called to the house and the boy reported the interactions to them at the time, but at that point did not want to pursue the matter further. When he saw that Ahmad Khan was seeking election as an MP, the complainant went back to the police, and days before the vote he contacted the Conservative party press office to tell them that Ahmad Khan had sexually assaulted him when he was 15 years old. The complainant's older brother gave evidence that at the same party the MP had asked if he was "a true Scotsman" and lifted his kilt, before "lunging" at him. Another witness at the trial described waking to find Ahmad Khan sexually assaulting him by performing a sex act on him after a party in Pakistan in 2010, at which the pair had drunk whisky and smoked marijuana after which he said Ahmad Khan had offered him a sleeping pill; the witness said that he had reported the interaction to the British High Commission and the Foreign Office.

=== Conviction ===
On 11 April 2022, Ahmad Khan was found guilty of sexually assaulting the 15-year-old boy, contrary to section 3 of the Sexual Offences Act 2003. He was sentenced to prison for 18 months on 23 May.

Justice Jeremy Baker said that the boy, who was particularly vulnerable, had been profoundly psychologically affected, that Ahmad Khan did not regret his assault, and that he had displayed significant brutality. The victim stated that he had found it hard to be touched, and his mental health was harmed, including having suicidal thoughts. Shortly after the trial, Ahmad Khan was accused of having offered oral sex to a 16-year-old boy at a birthday party in Suffolk in 2015, and offering to take the youth to a hotel to use cocaine and hire a sex worker.

=== Aftermath ===
Ahmad Khan was expelled from the Conservative Party immediately following his conviction.

Conservative MP Crispin Blunt, chair of the Parliamentary committee on LGBTQ+ rights, defended Ahmad Khan after the trial, but was criticised for his "disgraceful" comments on the conviction as a "dreadful miscarriage of justice" and an international scandal. Several members of the committee resigned in response to his statement; Blunt subsequently apologised and withdrew his comments.

Ahmad Khan appealed against his conviction and sentence, but his appeal was dismissed in December 2022. On 5 December 2022, Ahmad Khan lost his appeal at the Court of Appeal. Both appeals were dismissed by three senior judges. Dismissing the conviction appeal, Mr. Justice Michael Sweeney, Dame Victoria Sharp, and Mr. Justice Thomas Linden said they had "no doubt" that the trial was fair and the conviction was safe. The hearing was also attended by Blunt.

Ahmad Khan was released from HM Prison Brixton in south London on probation on 21 February 2023, having served half of his 18-month sentence. Ahmad Khan's former agent and an independent councillor on Wakefield Council approached him as he exited the prison, asking if he had an apology for the people of Wakefield who had voted for him, but Ahmad Khan did not respond.

== Political positions ==
=== Brexit ===
Ahmad Khan supported Britain's withdrawal from the European Union. In an interview with Channel 4 he attributed his success in the 2019 general election to "Islington Remainers" who branded Leave voters "stupid, uneducated, racist or wrong". According to him, he decided to stand in the election because he came to believe British democracy was "under threat".

In September 2020, in a debate about the United Kingdom Internal Market Bill, Ahmad Khan declared: "I am an ardent supporter of Brexit and look forward eagerly to the opportunity to bolster the United Kingdom's position by becoming an independent, self-governing nation, possessed of the confidence that flows from our vision and principled values". In his speech, he went on to explain his concerns over the Internal Market Bill before backing the legislation.

=== National Trust coverage of slavery ===
Following an interim report on the connections between colonialism and properties now in the care of the National Trust, including links with historic slavery, Ahmad Khan was among the signatories of a letter to The Telegraph from the "Common Sense Group" of Conservative Parliamentarians. The letter accused the National Trust of being "coloured by cultural Marxist dogma, colloquially known as the 'woke agenda'".

== Personal life ==
Ahmad Khan describes himself as a "proud Yorkshireman" and a member of the Ahmadiyya Islamic messianic community.

Shortly after his election in 2019, the LGBT+ Conservatives group described Ahmad Khan as "openly gay", and he made news worldwide for becoming the first gay Muslim to be elected. After he said that he was not openly gay, they subsequently clarified their statement by saying that Khan "fully endorses" the group's aims "but is not an out LGBT MP". The confusion arose after an application was made in his name to a fund that supports "out" LGBT+ Conservative candidates; he said that the application was made in error. Ahmad Khan subsequently came out as gay during his trial in 2022.

Parliament of the United Kingdom
| Preceded by Mary Creagh | Member of Parliament for Wakefield; 2019–2022 | Succeeded by Simon Lightwood |
