= HWD =

HWD may refer to:

== Places in California, United States ==
- Hayward Executive Airport (IATA code: HWD)
- Hollywood, Los Angeles, a suburb

== Other uses ==
- HWD Hospital Radio, serving West Yorkshire, England
- Heavy Weight Deflectometer, a model of pavement test device
