= Kate Granger =

English geriatrician (1981–2016)

Kate Granger MBE FRCP
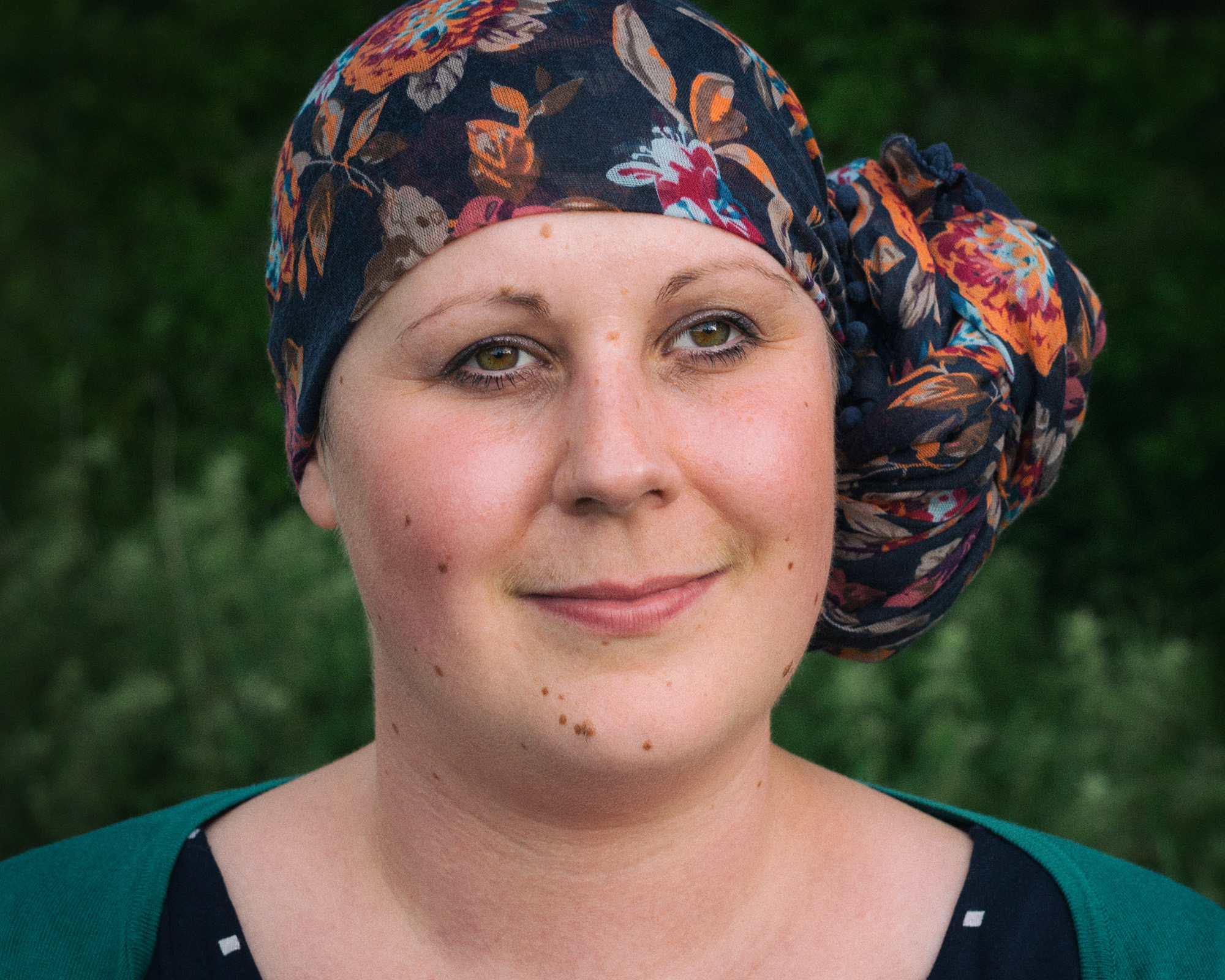
- Granger in June 2015
- Born: Kate Miriam Granger; 31 October 1981; Huddersfield, England
- Died: 23 July 2016 (aged 34); Leeds, England
- Cause of death: Desmoplastic small-round-cell tumor
- Education: University of Edinburgh
- Occupation: Geriatrician
- Employer: Mid Yorkshire Hospitals NHS Trust
- Known for: Activism for better patient care; Fundraising

Kate Miriam Granger (31 October 1981 – 23 July 2016) was an English geriatrician and campaigner for better patient care. In 2011 she was diagnosed with desmoplastic small-round-cell tumor (DSRCT), a type of sarcoma, and subsequently started the "#hellomynameis" campaign encouraging healthcare staff to introduce themselves to patients. Granger also raised over £250,000 for local cancer charity, the Yorkshire Cancer Centre Appeal (now Leeds Cancer Centre Charity).

== Early life ==
Originally from Huddersfield, West Yorkshire, Granger studied at the University of Edinburgh, obtaining a BSc in Pharmacology in 2002 and an MB ChB in 2005. After qualifying she returned to West Yorkshire to work, obtaining a position with the Mid Yorkshire Hospitals NHS Trust, at Pinderfields Hospital, Wakefield.

== Illness ==
Granger first became ill when on holiday in California in July 2011 with her husband Chris Pointon. She was treated in the Emergency Room in Santa Cruz when her kidneys failed. She returned to Leeds and was given further tests. When told the diagnosis, she knew that DSRCT that had metastasized had "an utterly dismal prognosis". She was treated with P6 protocol chemotherapy and endured painful treatments which she described in detail in her blog "The Other Side and the Bright Side".

She described how the news that her condition was incurable was broken to her:

If you can put yourself in my position – I'm 29 years old, I know I've got cancer, I think it's confined to my abdomen so I'm expecting to have an operation, maybe some chemotherapy and possibly a cure. I'm in a side room. I can hear everything that's going on outside. I'm in pain and alone. A junior doctor comes to see me to talk to me about the results of the MRI scan I'd had earlier in the week. I'd never met this doctor before. He came into my room, he sat down in the chair next to me and looked away from me. Without any warning or asking if I wanted anyone with me he just said, "Your cancer has spread". He then could not leave the room quick enough and I was left in deep psychological distress. I never saw him again. I am a little bit psychologically scarred by that experience.

Granger was the subject the second ever Dying Matters Annual Lecture 2014, with a filmed conversation with Granger.

After her diagnosis, Granger continued her medical training and qualified as a consultant geriatrician. During the latter stages of her illness, she was treated at St Gemma's Hospice, Leeds. She died on 23 July 2016, aged 34.

== Campaigns ==
=== #hellomynameis ===
Granger started the #hellomynameis campaign in 2013, chiefly using Twitter, where by the time of her death, she had over 40,000 followers. The campaign name was the Twitter hashtag #hellomynameis, which has received more than 1.5 billion Twitter impressions. It was intended to encourage healthcare staff to introduce themselves to patients, following her experiences that she discussed in her book The Other Side.

On 31 August 2015, the second anniversary of the campaign, she recalled:

I had been moaning to Chris about the lack of introductions from the healthcare staff looking after me. Being the practical optimist that Chris is, he simply told me to 'stop whinging darling and if it is that important to you do something about it.' So we did.

Kate spoke at the NHS Confederation annual conference in 2014 on the campaign.

As of February 2015, the campaign has been endorsed by more than 400,000 doctors, nurses, therapists, receptionists and porters across over 90 organisations, including NHS Trusts across England, NHS Scotland, NHS Wales and the NHS in Northern Ireland. She had spoken passionately at many health conferences and her campaign is supported by the former Prime Minister David Cameron, Nicola Sturgeon, Health Secretary Jeremy Hunt, many celebrities, and a significant number of leaders in health organisations in the UK and overseas. The campaign continues each 23 July (the anniversary of her death) across the NHS. In 2020 Leeds Cares published videos from staff to celebrate Kate and continue to campaign to improve patient care.

=== Fundraising ===
Granger donated proceeds from the sales of her two books, and sponsored events such as a tandem skydiving jump, to cancer research. In total she raised over £250,000 for the Yorkshire Cancer Centre.

== Awards and honours ==
In February 2014, NHS England created the Kate Granger Awards for Compassionate Care. These annual awards are in honour of Granger to "recognise an individual, team or organisation that has made a positive difference to patient care". In 2017, the publicly voted for Yorkshire Choice Awards introduced the Kate Granger Award for Outstanding Achievement. Healthcare Information and Management Systems Society launched the European Kate Granger Awards for Compassionate Care in 2018. In 2019, The Leeds Teaching Hospitals NHS Trust gave an award in Kate's honour as part of their Leeds Hospital Heroes for making a positive difference on the patient experience.

In June 2014, Granger was elected as a Fellow of the Royal College of Physicians, the first doctor in training that the college had elected as a fellow, in recognition of her contribution to healthcare.

Granger was made a Member of the Most Excellent Order of the British Empire (MBE) in the 2015 New Year Honours for services to the NHS and improving care. Her award was presented to her at Buckingham Palace by the Prince of Wales, in June 2015. Also in 2015, she was made an honorary Doctor of Science by London South Bank University.

In 2016, Granger received a special achievement award from the BMJ, honouring her for her work on the "Hello, my name is" campaign.

Granger's name is one of those featured on the sculpture Ribbons, unveiled in 2024.

== Publications ==
- Granger, Kate (2012). The Other Side. Kate Granger. ISBN 978-1-4716-2585-5.
- Granger, Kate; Thompson, Michael (2012). The Bright Side. Kate Granger. ISBN 978-1-4717-6213-0.
- Granger, Kate; Healthcare staff must properly introduce themselves to patients. BMJ 2013; 347 (Published 2 October 2013)
