= Balfour Beatty Construction =

American commercial construction company

Balfour Beatty Construction US
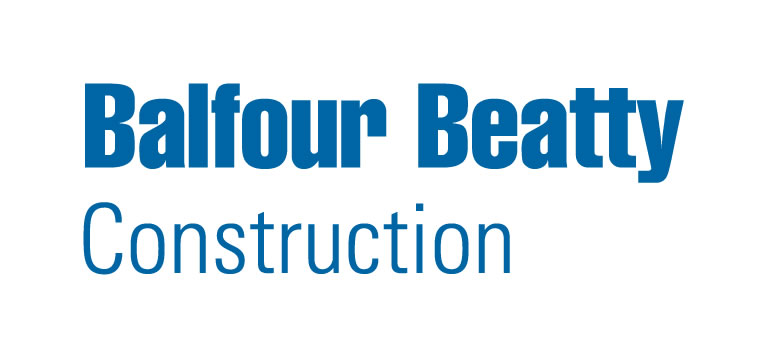
- Company type: Public company
- Industry: Construction
- Founded: 1933
- Headquarters: Dallas, Texas, United States
- Key people: Leon Blondin, CEO
- Services: Construction Management, General Contracting, Cost Consulting, Design-Build, Preconstruction Services, Public-Private Partnerships
- Revenue: $4.5 Billion (2015)
- Number of employees: 2,400
- Parent: Balfour Beatty plc
- Website: www.balfourbeattyus.com

Balfour Beatty Construction, formerly Centex Construction, is a commercial construction company, headquartered in Dallas, Texas, with full service offices in the United States. Balfour Beatty Construction's parent company is Balfour Beatty in London.

== History ==
Balfour Beatty Construction's roots emerge from two regional construction businesses, Frank J. Rooney Construction Company in Miami, Florida, and Eugene Simpson and Company in Washington, DC, which were both founded in 1933.

Centex Corporation acquired these, and other regionally-based construction companies through the 1960s and 1970s to form Centex Construction, the commercial building arm of Centex Corporation.

Centex Construction operated through early 2007, when it was acquired by Balfour Beatty. Since then, the United States branch of the construction company has operated as Balfour Beatty Construction.

== Timeline ==
- 1933: Frank J. Rooney Construction Company (now Balfour Beatty Construction's Florida division) and Eugene Simpson & Company (now Balfour Beatty Construction's Washington, D.C. division) are founded.
- 1936: J.W. Bateson Company (now Balfour Beatty Construction's North Texas division) is founded.
- 1966: Centex acquires J.W. Bateson.
- 1971: Completion of the Cinderella Castle and other projects at Disney World, which opens to the public.
- 1972: Completion of Texas Stadium, former home of the Dallas Cowboys.
- 1987: Centex purchases the backlog and other assets of Rogers Construction Company in Nashville, Tennessee; the newly formed company is named Centex-Rodgers Construction.
- 1989: Completion of the Morton H. Meyerson Symphony Center in Dallas.
- 1994: Centex Construction is ranked as the second largest general contractor in the U.S. and also the third largest builder of healthcare facilities.
- 1995: The Alfred P. Murrah Federal Building, built by J.W. Bateson, is the target of terrorist bomber Timothy McVeigh.
- 1996: Completion of the NASA Mission Control in Houston, Texas.
- 2001: The company forms a startup division (Southeast Division) in Charlotte, North Carolina.
- 2003: Centex Construction is chosen to build the Pentagon Memorial to victims of the 9/11 terrorist attack in Washington, D.C., the National Museum of the Marine Corps, and the United States Air Force Memorial.
- 2004: Completion of the Gaylord Texan Resort Hotel & Convention Center in Grapevine, Texas.
- 2004: Completion of the Mark O. Hatfield Clinical Research Center, National Institutes of Health Clinical Center in Bethesda, Maryland.
- 2007: Centex Construction is acquired by Balfour Beatty plc, a U.K.-based international engineering and construction group. The company is re-branded as Balfour Beatty Construction.

Balfour Beatty Construction has embarked on a series of acquisitions including Charter Builders in 2006, R.T. Dooley and SpawMaxwell in 2009, Barnhart and Charter Builders in 2010, and most recently in June 2011, Howard S. Wright.

== Operations ==
Balfour Beatty Construction offers several services: Construction management, general contracting, cost consulting, design-build, preconstruction services, public-private partnerships, and IDIQ/JOC.

The company has been identified as a Top Ten Green Builder, loss prevention (a safety record that is more than three times better than the industry average), and employee engagement (named one of Fortune magazine's 100 Best Companies to Work For in four consecutive years).

== See also ==
- Clark Construction
