= Kut Barrage =

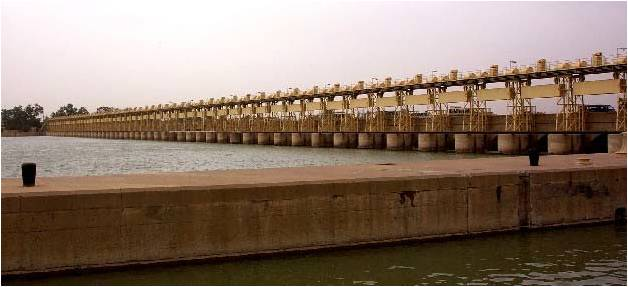

- Location within Iraq
- Location: Wasit Governorate, Iraq
- Coordinates: 32.498889°N 45.817778°E
- Opening date: 1939

Dam and spillways
- Impounds: Tigris River
- Height: 10.5 m (34 ft)
- Length: 516 m (1,693 ft)

The Kut Barrage is a barrage on the Tigris river, located in the modern town of Kut in Wasit Governorate, Iraq.

== Technical details ==
It is 516 metres (1,693 ft) long, 10.5 metres (34 ft) high, and consists of 56 gates, each 6 metres (20 ft) wide. The maximum discharge of the barrage is 6,000 cubic metres (7,800 cu yd), but actual discharge has not exceeded 2,000 cubic metres (2,600 cu yd) in the last 10 years. The barrage supports a road and includes a lock for boats passing up and down the Tigris.

Its purpose is to maintain a sufficiently high water level in the Tigris to provide water for the Gharraf irrigation canal, which branches off the Tigris just upstream from the Kut Barrage. Before the construction of the Kut Barrage, the Gharraf canal only received water during periods of flood in the Tigris. The water level in the canal is maintained by the Gharraf Head Regulator, which was constructed at the same time as the Kut Barrage.

== History ==
The Kut Barrage was constructed between 1934 and 1939 by the British firm Balfour Beatty. Construction of the barrage was carried out by 2,500 Arab and Kurdish workers, and involved the removal of 1,223,288 cubic metres (1,600,000 cu yd) of ground. For the barrage itself 191,139 cubic metres (250,000 cu yd) of concrete was used. A major flood in the Tigris in 1936 caused the building site to be flooded entirely, and led to the temporary standstill of the construction works.

In 1952, 26,440 hectares (65,300 acres) were irrigated from water provided by the Gharraf Canal. Of this newly reclaimed land, 14,080 hectares (34,800 acres) was distributed to small farmers as part of a social land reform program. These farmers received 10 hectares (25 acres) per family and were required to live on the land they farmed.

In 2005, repairs and maintenance works were carried out at the Kut Barrage and the Gharraf Head Regulator for a total cost of US$3 million.

== Gallery ==
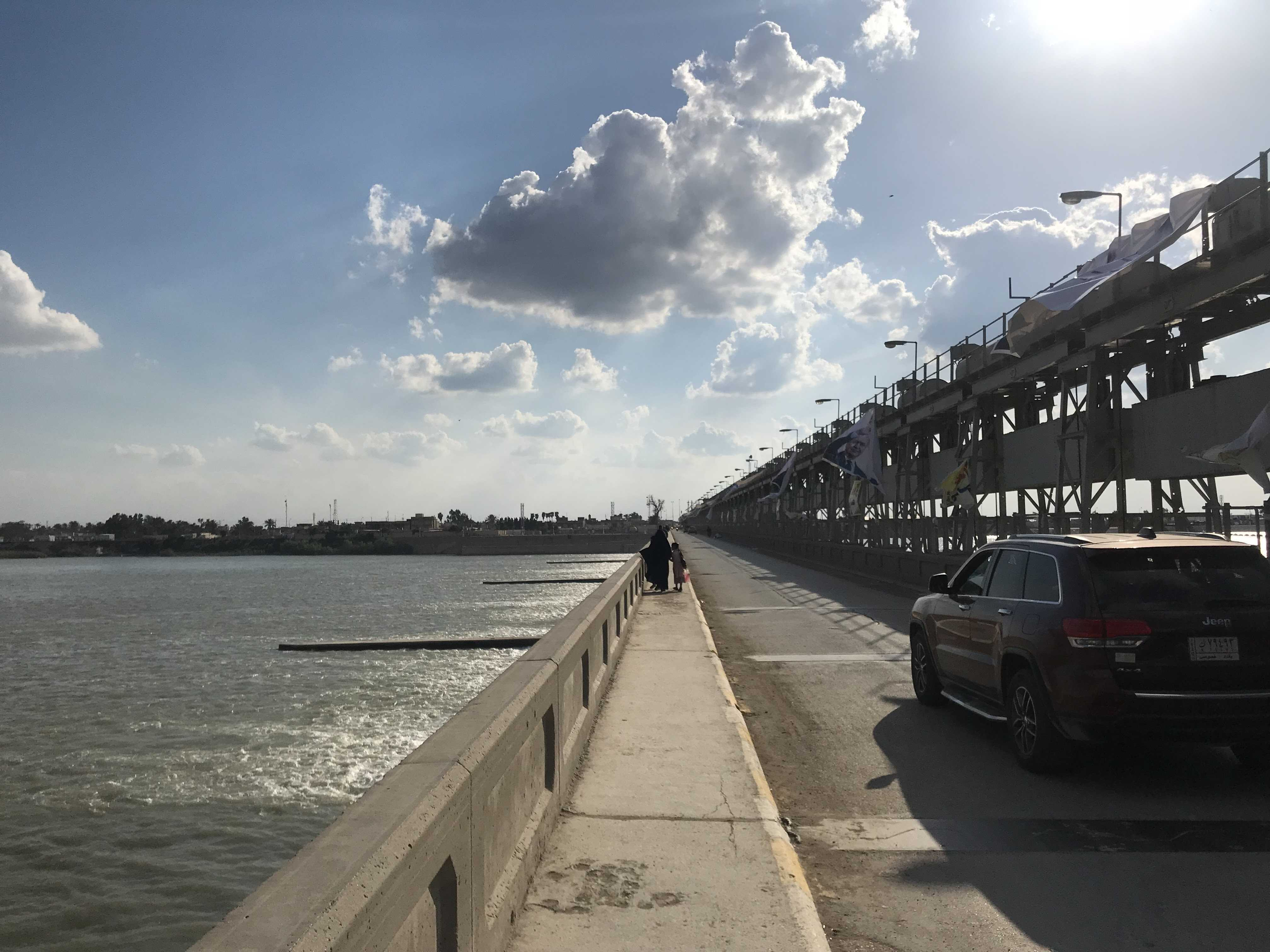

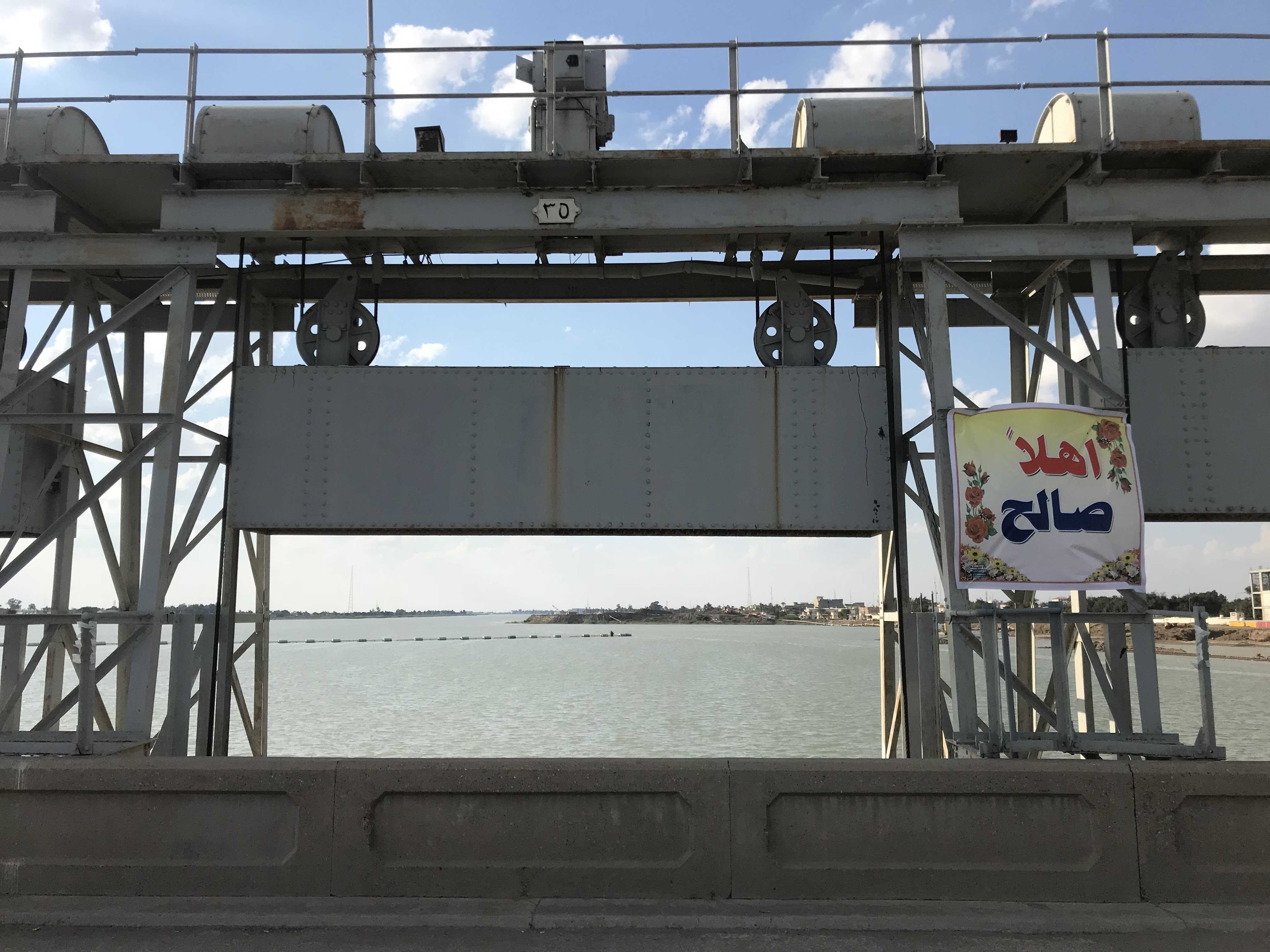

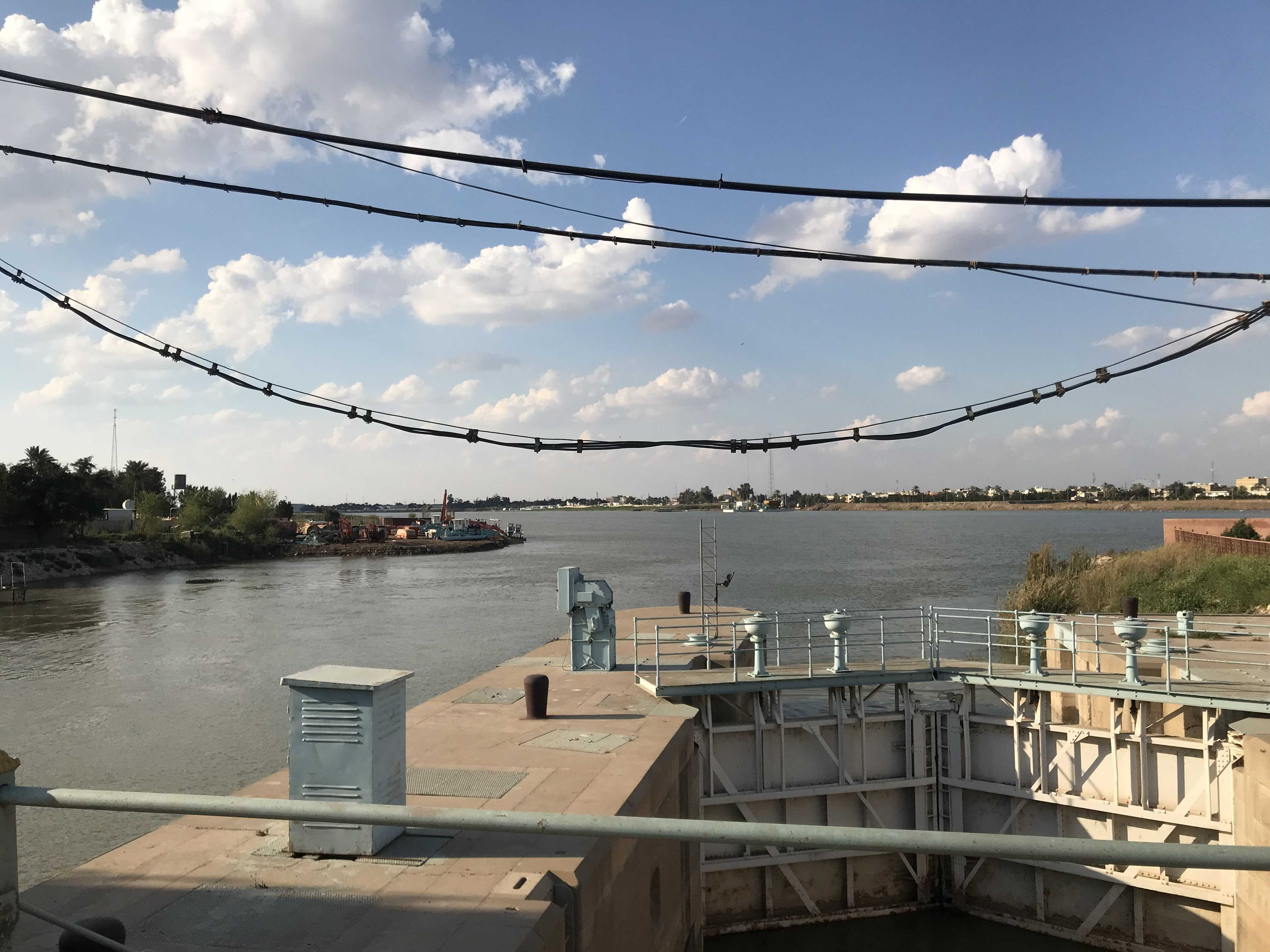
