= Mid Yorkshire Teaching NHS Trust =

NHS trust

- Type: NHS hospital trust
- Budget: £460 million
- Hospitals: Pontefract Hospital; Pinderfields Hospital; Dewsbury and District Hospital
- Chair: Keith Ramsay
- Chief executive: Len Richards
- Staff: 8,000
- Website: www.midyorks.nhs.uk

Mid Yorkshire Teaching NHS Trust runs Pontefract Hospital, Pinderfields Hospital in Wakefield and Dewsbury and District Hospital and community health services in Wakefield, all in West Yorkshire, England.

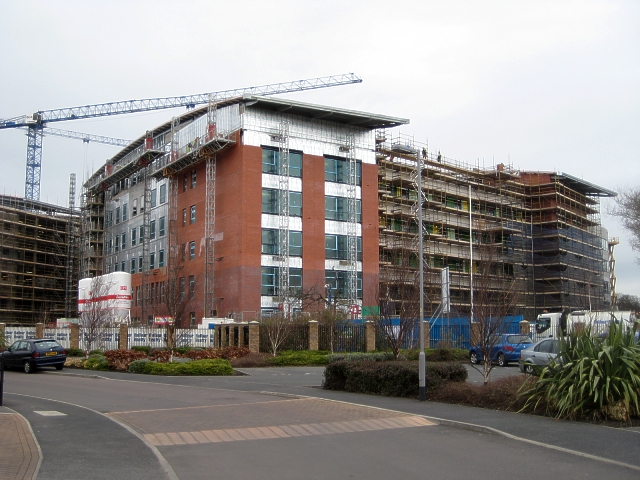
Pinderfields Hospital in Wakefield is the trust's largest.

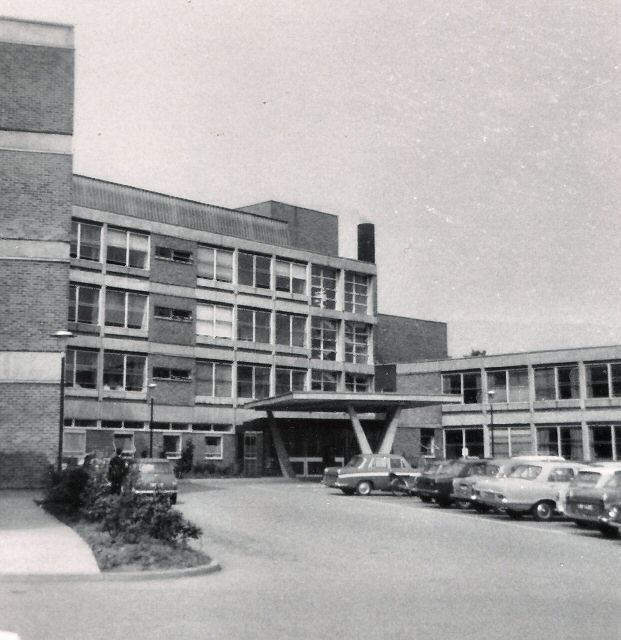
Pontefract General Infirmary seen in 1969.

It has been under financial pressure for many years. In April 2012 it was described as "among the small group of the most visibly troubled providers nationally" and the possibility that the trust would be split in three and joined with other local providers was considered. In October 2013 it was proposing to reconfigure services between the three sites. in 2026 it announced plans for 260 redundancies, part of plans to save £57 million.

In November 2013 it was revealed that the beds at Dewsbury and District Hospital would drop from 360 to 110 if the radical shake-up went ahead. The number of beds at Pinderfields would rise from 730 to 810.

Balfour Beatty built Pinderfields and Pontefract hospitals as part of a £311 million private finance initiative deal with Royal Bank of Scotland. They were leased back from the companies by the Trust over 35 years. In 2011, through its subsidiary Royal Bank Project Investments, RBS sold its 50% stake to HICL Infrastructure, an investment company originally set up by HSBC bank. Balfour Beatty sold its 50% interest in the hospitals for £61.5 million, a profit of £42.2 million in October 2014. The trust makes payments of £38 million a year until 2042 plus inflated charges for minor works.

Kier Group has a £22 million contract to revamp Dewsbury and District Hospital.

== Trust name ==
The name of the trust changed on 1 May 2023 from its previous name of Mid Yorkshire Hospitals NHS Trust, following its partnership with the University of Leeds.

Mid Yorkshire Hospitals NHS Trust came into being when the former Pinderfields and Pontefract Hospitals NHS Trust and Dewsbury Health Care NHS Trust merged on 1 April 2002.

== Performance ==
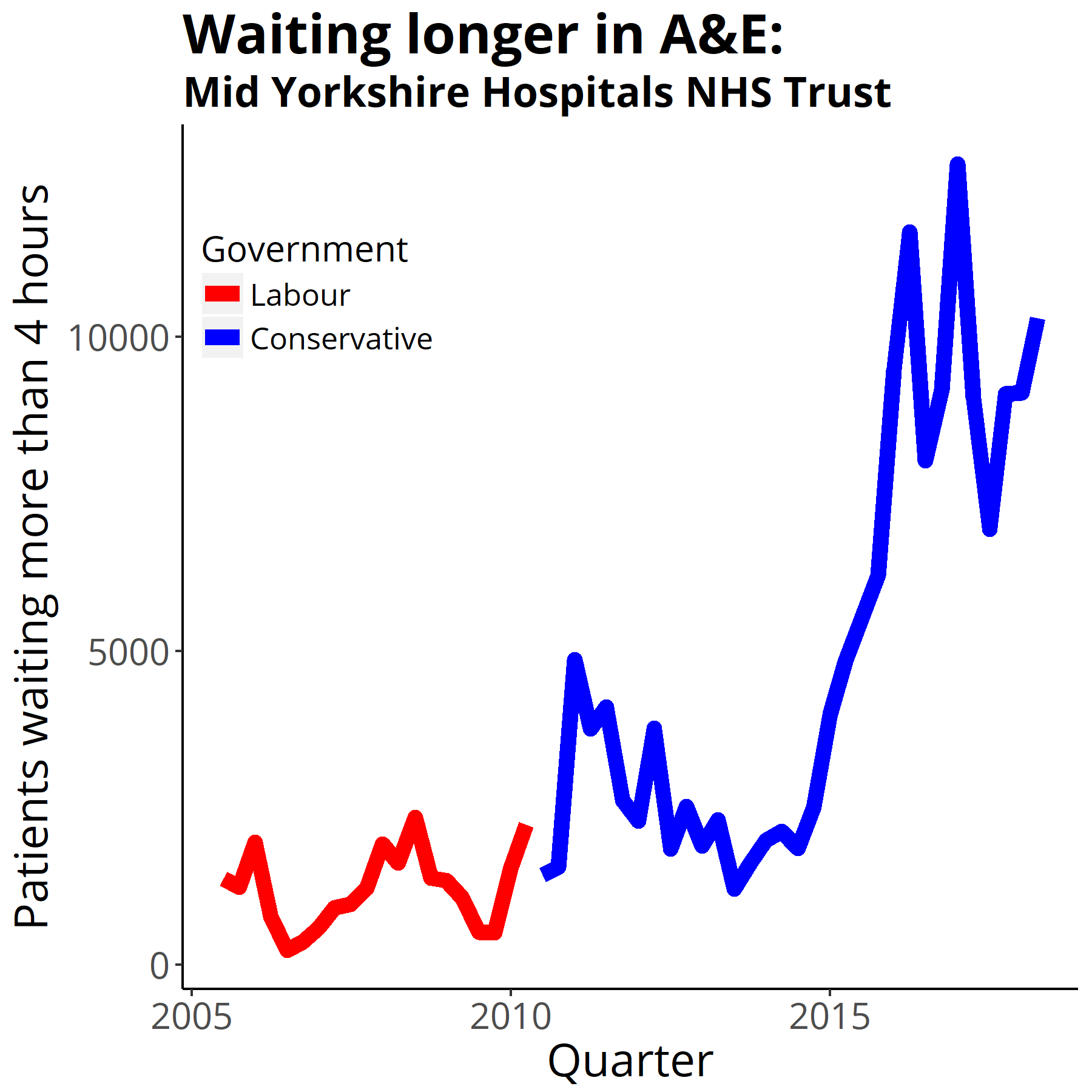
Four-hour target in the emergency department quarterly figures from NHS England Data from https://www.england.nhs.uk/statistics/statistical-work-areas/ae-waiting-times-and-activity/

It spent 6.9% of its total turnover on agency staff in 2014/5. In February 2016 it was expecting a deficit of £23.4 million for the year 2015/6.

In January 2018 patients were pictured sleeping on the bare floors of Pinderfields Hospital.

== See also ==
- Kate Granger
- List of hospitals in England
- List of NHS trusts
- HWD Hospital Radio
