= City of Carlisle Electric Tramways =

Electric tramway service in England

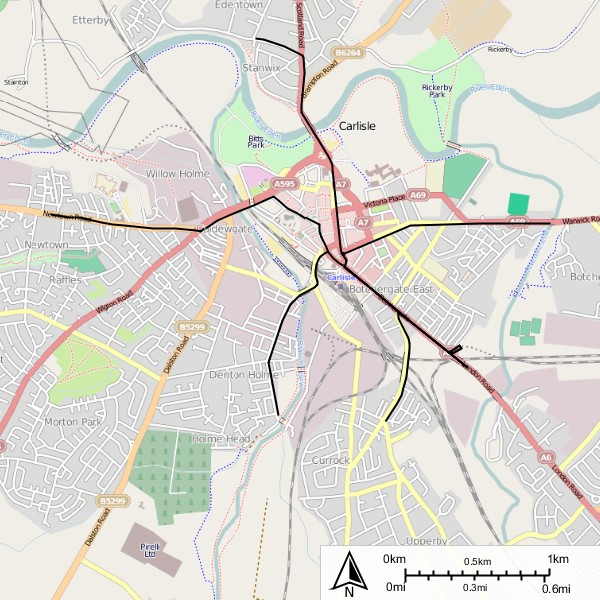
- Map of the routes of the City of Carlisle Electric Tramways

Operation
- Locale: Carlisle
- Open: 30 June 1900
- Close: 21 November 1931
- Status: Closed

Infrastructure
- Track gauge: 3 ft 6 in (1,067 mm)
- Propulsion system: Electric

Statistics
- Route length: 5.73 miles (9.22 km)

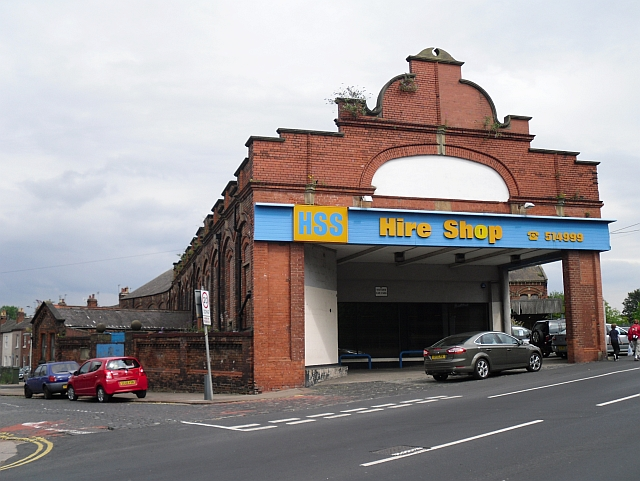
Former tram shed, London Road

The City of Carlisle Electric Tramways Company operated an electric tramway service in Carlisle between 1900 and 1931.

== History ==
The Carlisle Tramways Order 1898 authorised the construction of an electric tramway and construction began in 1899. The system comprised six lines radiating from Carlisle railway station to Newtown, Stanwix, along Warwick Road to Petteril Bridge, London Road, Boundary Road and Denton Holme.

The tramway was operated by the City of Carlisle Electric Tramways Co. Ltd, power being taken from the corporation's supply station in James Street and opened for public service on 30 June 1900

In 1911, the concern was sold to Balfour Beatty who undertook track renewals and replaced the fleet of tramcars at a cost of £18,000 (equivalent to £1,833,156 in 2025).

After the First World War, the company was unable to expand the services to meet the needs of an expanding town, and had started its own motorbuses services. In 1926, it changed its name to Carlisle and District Transport Company.

== Fleet ==
- 1-15 Electric Railway and Tramway Carriage Works 1900 – disposed of in 1912
- 1-12 United Electric Car Company 1912
- 13 Second hand car (1903) from Ilkeston Corporation Tramways obtained in 1920
- 14 English Electric 1925
- 15 English Electric 1923

== Closure ==
Carlisle Corporation purchased the assets of the company on 5 March 1931, and after being unable to get agreement with local bus operators and secure an operating licence, closed the tramway system on 21 November 1931. In 2011, plans were made to send the remains of a Carlisle tram to Workington for partial restoration and in 2013 it was announced that this was about to begin using Wolverhampton Corporation Tramways number 49, based at Black Country Living Museum, as a model. As of 2020, the surviving parts were still awaiting restoration, having spent some time in the undercroft at Carlisle railway station.
