= Pontefract Hospital =

- Mid Yorkshire Teaching NHS Trust
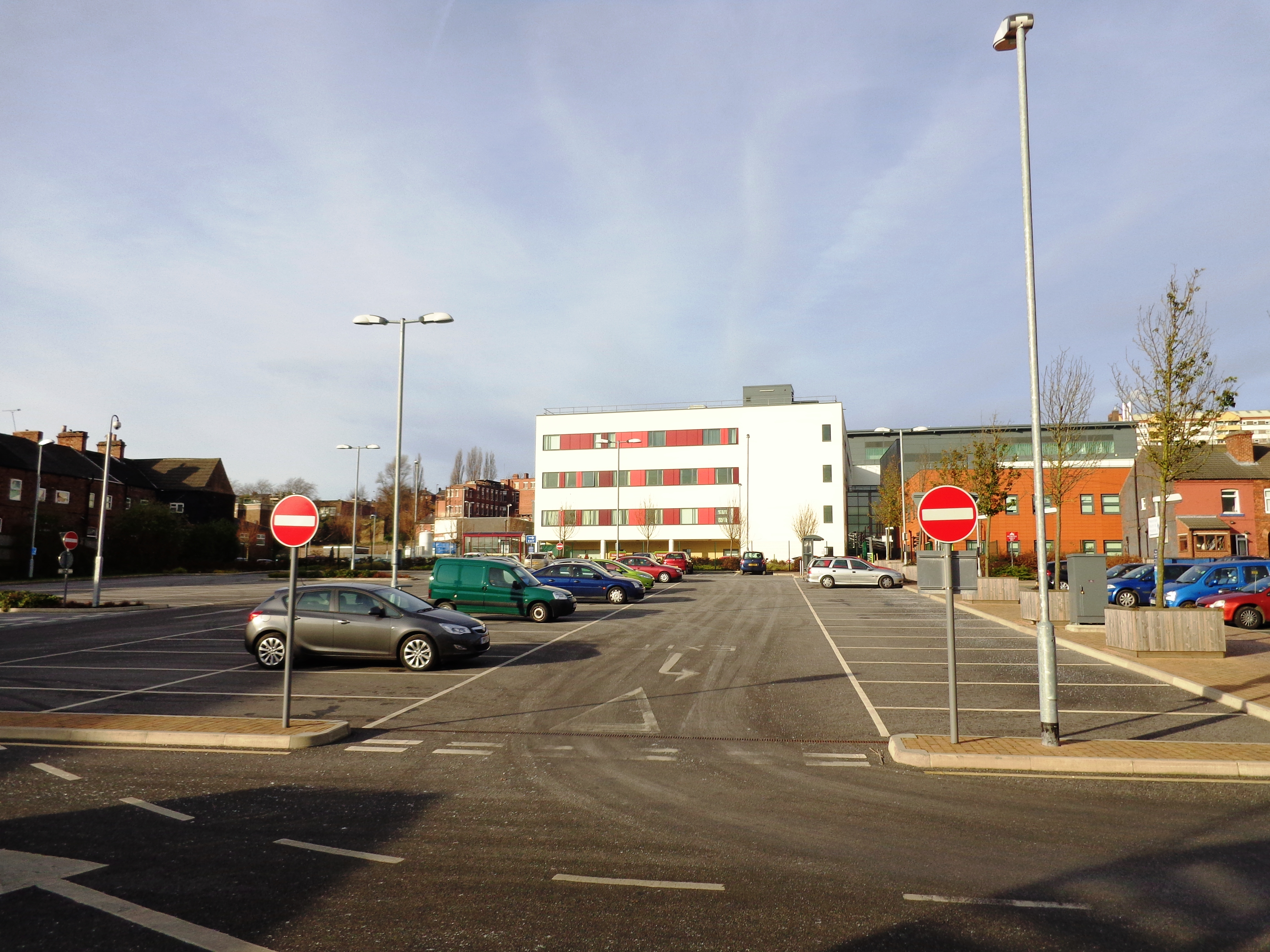
- The new Pontefract Hospital which replaced the predecessor hospital on the same site

- Location in West Yorkshire

Geography
- Location: Pontefract, West Yorkshire, England
- Coordinates: 53.69020°N 1.30868°W

Organisation
- Care system: NHS

History
- Founded: 2010

Links
- Website: www.midyorks.nhs.uk
- Lists: Hospitals in England

Pontefract Hospital is an acute District General Hospital in Pontefract, West Yorkshire operated by the Mid Yorkshire Teaching NHS Trust. The hospital primarily serves the towns of Pontefract and the five towns.

== History ==
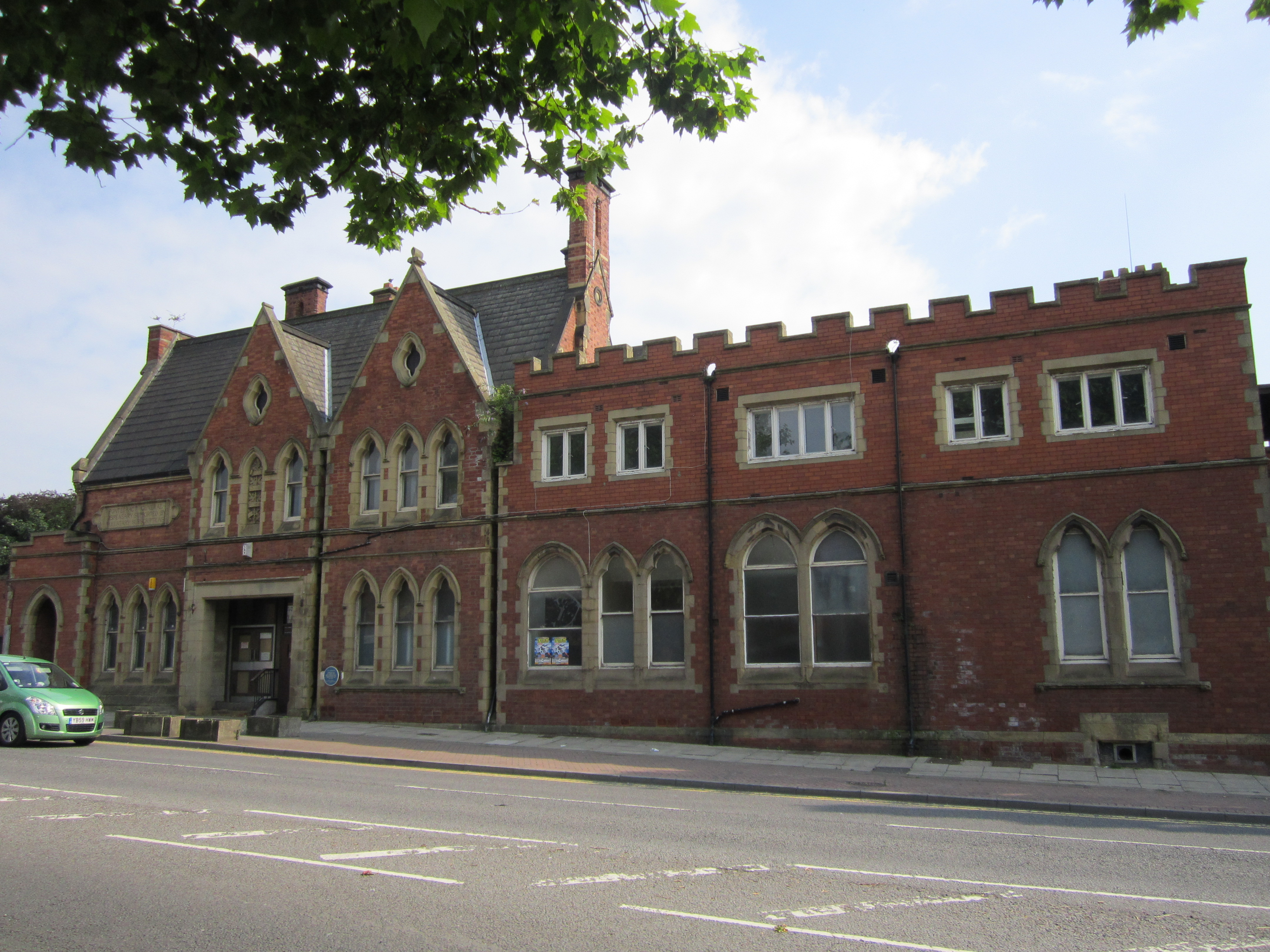
The old Pontefract General Infirmary

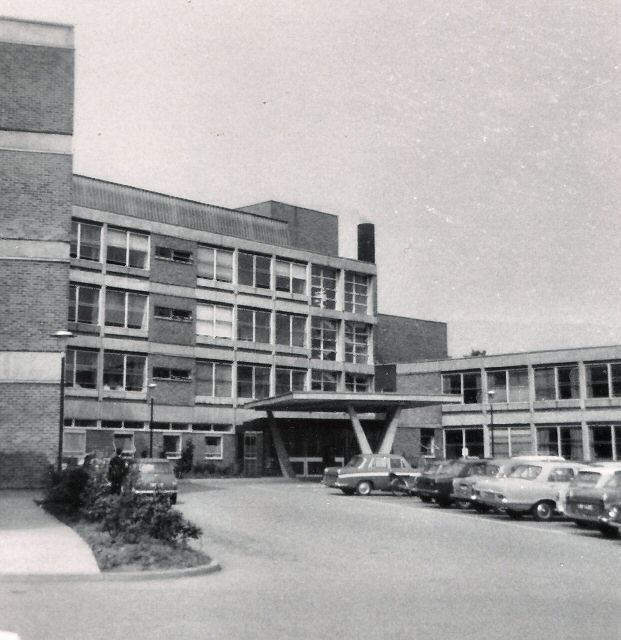
Former hospital buildings, now demolished for the new hospital, photographed in 1969.

The original hospital in Pontefract was the Pontefract Dispensary which was established in Sessions House Yard in 1812. The foundation stone for a new hospital in Southgate was laid by Hugh Childers, Secretary of State for War on 7 May 1880; it was opened by John Rhodes, the Mayor of Wakefield, on 8 December 1880. The facility became Pontefract General Infirmary on the formation of the National Health Service in 1948.

A new hospital, to be known as the Pontefract Hospital, was procured under a Private Finance Initiative contract to replace Pontefract General Infirmary in 2007. The new hospital, which was designed by the Building Design Partnership and built by Balfour Beatty at a cost of circa £150 million, was completed in January 2010. It was opened by the Duke of Gloucester in July 2010.

In March 2018 it was announced that the Accident and Emergency Department at Pontefract Hospital would be reclassified as a 24-hour Urgent Treatment Centre from the following months with people with life-threatening injuries being sent to the nearest A&E department which is at, Pinderfields Hospital instead. The local MP, Yvette Cooper, responded to the action:

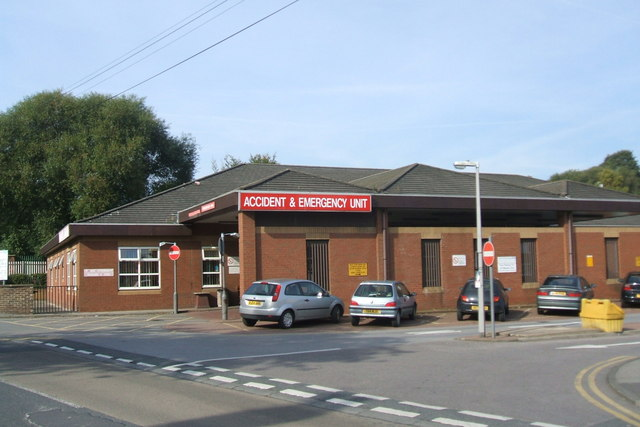
The former A&E unit

These proposals are a disgrace. They are ignoring the thousands of people who backed our campaign for the Trust to keep its promise of 24/7 consultant led A&E at Pontefract. Last year they closed Pontefract A&E overnight and we forced them to reopen it with public meetings and petitions. Now they are trying to downgrade Pontefract A&E during the daytime. This is clearly all about cuts. The Trust is being forced to make big cuts by Government reforms and the services we were promised are under threat as a result. Yet we already know Pinderfields is struggling to cope and sending more patients there is madness. It's unfair to patients who are waiting too long to be seen and it's unfair to staff who are already over-stretched. Hospital bosses know we won't accept this plan and we won't give up the fight for a proper A&E at Pontefract.

— Yvette Cooper

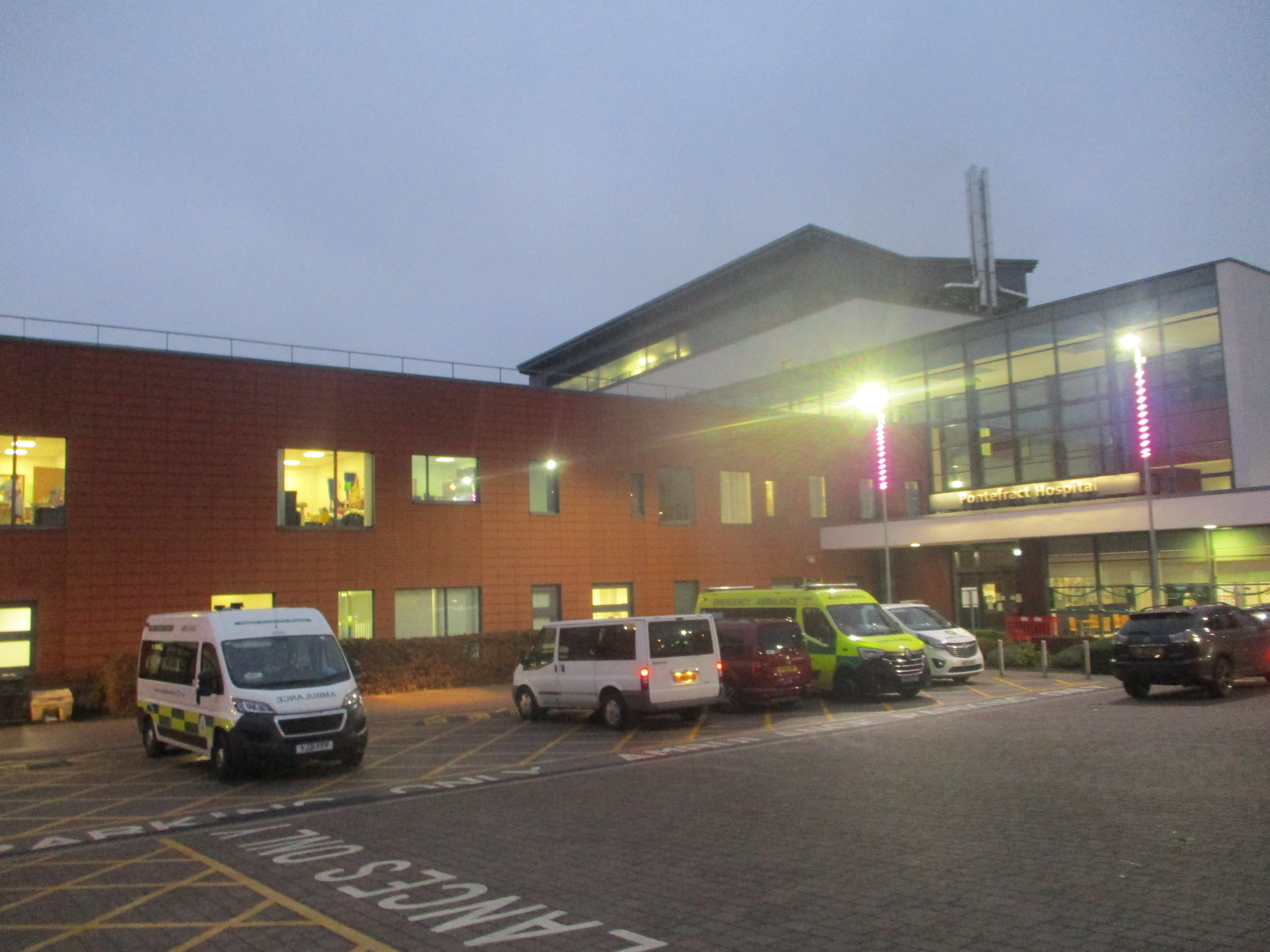
Friarwood Lane entrance to the hospital

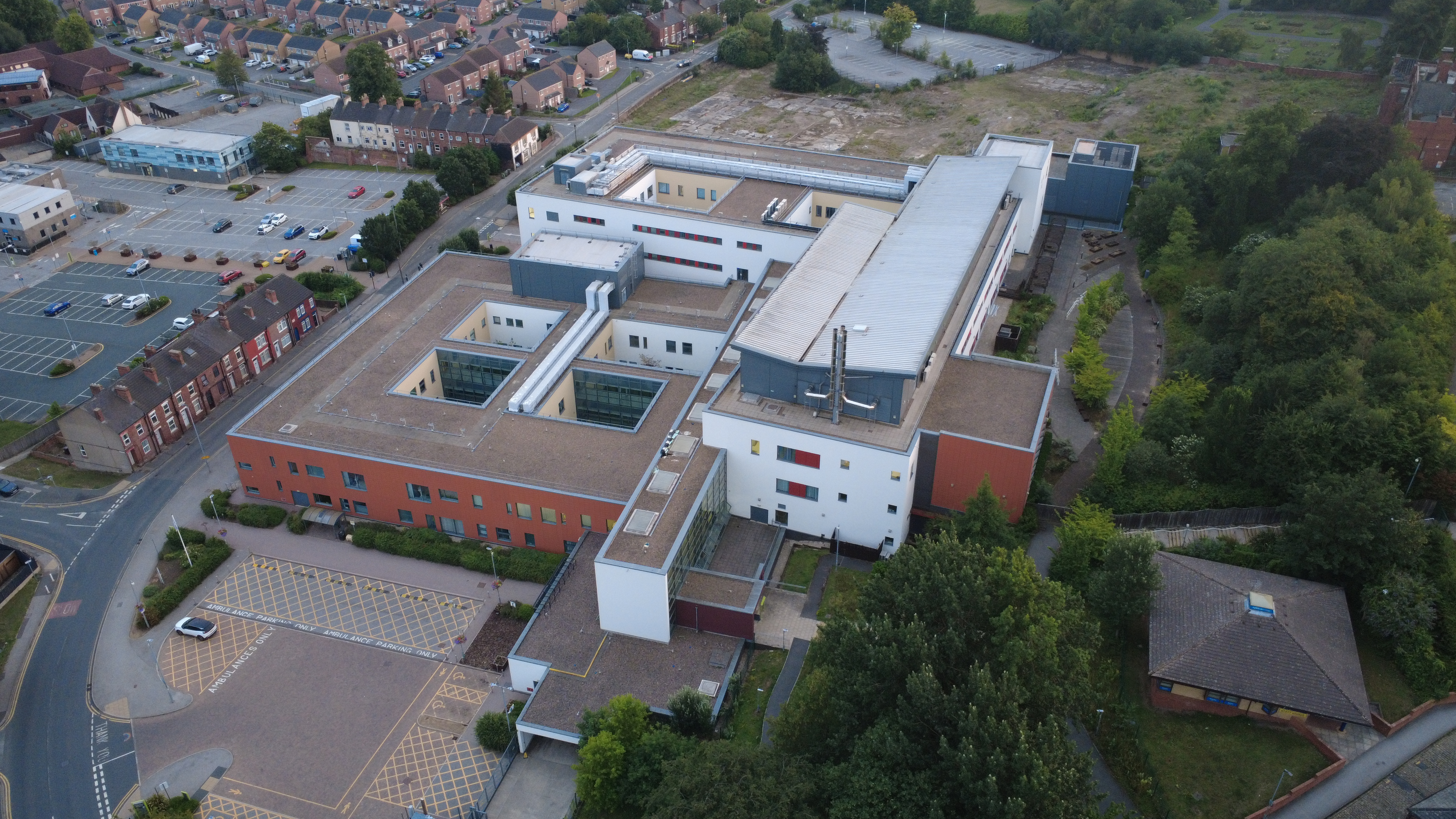
Aerial photograph of Pontefract Hospital in 2025

In October 2019, Mid Yorkshire Trust announced that the maternity-led birth centre would be shut until October 2020 "on the grounds of safety" due to a national shortage of midwives. It also announced that it would be closing 12 of the 42 beds at the hospital's stroke and rehabilitation unit. Local MP Yvette Cooper has led a campaign against the action, calling it "an absolute disgrace".
