= Balfour Beatty =

British multinational infrastructure group

Balfour Beatty plc
- Formerly: BICC Public Limited Company (1945–2000)
- Type: Public limited company
- Traded as: LSE: BBY; FTSE 100 component
- ISIN: GB0000961622
- Industry: Infrastructure professional services; Construction services; Support services; Infrastructure investments
- Founded: 1909
- Founders: George Balfour; Andrew Beatty
- Headquarters: London, England, UK
- Key people: Lord Allen (Chairman); Philip Hoare (CEO)
- Revenue: ▲£10,767 million (2025)
- Operating income: ▲£252 million (2025)
- Net income: ▲£264 million (2025)
- Number of employees: 26,000 (2026)
- Website: balfourbeatty.com

Balfour Beatty plc (/ˌbælfʊər ˈbiːtiː/) is an international infrastructure group based in the United Kingdom with capabilities in construction services, support services and infrastructure investments. A constituent of the FTSE 100 Index, the company is active across the UK, US and Hong Kong. In terms of turnover, Balfour Beatty was ranked in 2021 as the biggest construction contractor in the United Kingdom.

It was formed on 12 January 1909 by the engineer George Balfour and the accountant Andrew Beatty. Initially working on tramways, the company soon expanded into power and general contracting; the First World War saw it construct several army bases and various other works to support the British war effort. During the 1920s and 1930s, Balfour Beatty reoriented away from bus and tramway operations towards more lucrative heavy civil engineering, particularly the development of Britain's National Grid and various power stations. Early international projects include hydro electric power schemes in the Dolomites, Malaya and India, power stations in Argentina and Uruguay, and the Kut Barrage on the Tigris in Iraq. During the Second World War, the company's construction efforts were dominated by the war effort, including blocking the approaches to Scapa Flow and the building of six Mulberry harbour units.

For a time, Balfour Beatty's activities were dominated by two domestic sectors: power stations and the railways. It also opted to develop its presence as contractor within various power and civil engineering projects. Throughout the 1970s, Balfour Beatty expanded its presence in the road construction sector through schemes such as the M73 motorway and the Glasgow Inner Ring Road. Between 1986 and 1995, Balfour Beatty operated Balfour Beatty Homes; after a collapse of the housing market, Balfour Beatty Homes was renamed Clarke Homes and then sold to Westbury. During the 2000s, the company's business strategy diversified from the construction of infrastructure alone towards the financing, operation, design and management functions. Balfour Beatty also pursued a strategy of growth via acquisition, primarily in the United Kingdom and North America, including Mansell plc, Birse Group, Rok plc, Centex Construction, Parsons Brinckerhoff, and Howard S. Wright.

During the 2010s, several instances of legal action was taken against the company for its alleged use of blacklists. In 2014, Balfour Beatty rebuffed three offers by Carillion, its primary British-based rival at that time, to purchase the company. Throughout the 2010s and 2020s, Balfour Beatty has been heavily involved in several major railway projects in Britain, including High Speed 2, Crossrail, and the modernisation of the Great Western Main Line. In October 2005, Balfour Beatty was found guilty of breaching health and safety laws, and were fined £10 million for its involvement in the October 2000 Hatfield rail crash.

== History ==
=== Early years ===
Balfour Beatty was formed on 12 January 1909, with a capital of £50,000. The two founding principals were George Balfour, a qualified mechanical and electrical engineer, and Andrew Beatty, an accountant. The two had met while working for the London branch of the New York engineers JG White & Company. Initially, the company concentrated on tramways, the first contract being to construct the Dunfermline and District Tramways that opened in November 1909 for Balfour Beatty's own subsidiary, the Fife Tramway Light and Power Company.

Balfour Beatty's fortunes were heavily impacted by the outbreak of the First World War. A portion of its staff were drawn away to serve in the British Army. Its expertise in general construction was put to use in the development of numerous army camps, including a large complex at Ripon. It also built an 8km aqueduct at Kinlochleven to supply the works of the British Aluminium Company; this was the company's first endeavour into heavy civil engineering. This contracting work would develop into a lucrative activity for the business.

During its first two decades of operations, the company acquired a portfolio of electric power and tramway companies including in Carlisle, Cheltenham, Leamington & Warwick, Llanelly, Luton, Mansfield, Nottinghamshire & Derby, Falkirk and Wemyss. Some later operated trolley and motor buses. Several bus companies were purchased or formed including Midland General, Percivals (Carlisle), Stratford Blue and Scottish General Omnibus.

The Scottish bus subsidiaries were sold in June 1930 to W Alexander & Sons, and the Scottish tramways in 1935 to Scottish Motor Traction, Cheltenham was sold in July 1939 to Red & White Services with the remaining operations transferred to the Tilling Group.

George Balfour was elected to the House of Commons in 1918 and played a large part in the debates which established the National Grid. To service this new market, George Balfour, Andrew Beatty and others formed Power Securities to finance projects, and the two companies, with their common directors, worked closely together. Balfour Beatty was heavily involved in the development of Scotland's hydro electric power, building dams, transmission lines and power stations.

Other work during the interwar period included the standardisation of the electricity supply in Derbyshire and Nottinghamshire, and the construction of tunnels and escalators for the London Underground. Extensive overseas work started in 1924 when Balfour Beatty took over the management of the East African Power & Lighting company; construction work included hydro electric schemes in the Dolomites, Malaya and India, power stations in Argentina and Uruguay, and the Kut Barrage on the Tigris in Iraq.

By the onset of the Second World War, control of the firm had changed: Andrew Beatty had died in 1934 and George Balfour died in 1941. David Balfour, son of George Balfour, had become a director in the company by this time, and was released from service with the Army to participate in construction projects at the behest of the Admiralty. The company's construction efforts were dominated by the war effort; notable projects included blocking the approaches to Scapa Flow and the building of six Mulberry harbour units.

=== Post Second World War ===
Peacetime saw a resumption of Balfour Beatty's traditional work, which was for a time dominated by two domestic sectors: power stations and the railways. The business was impacted by the Attlee government's nationalisation of the electric industry with relatively little compensation received; similar moves took place in Canada and East Africa that also affected the company. During 1953, a construction company in Canada was acquired by Balfour Beatty; other activities included the Mto Mtwara harbour in Tanganyika (now Tanzania) and the Wadi Tharthar irrigation scheme in Iraq. However, the company's foreign activities were hindered by political factors in the Middle East and South America.

The business strategy pursued during this era was to develop its presence as contractor in power and civil engineering. Highlights of its portfolio in this area include Staythorpe B power station, Berkeley nuclear power station, and extensive upgrades to the National Grid. While further such projects, including facilities at Drax, Tilbury, Cockenzie, and Dungeness, were secured, it became clear by the 1960s that the company needed to expand beyond this sector. Balfour Beatty's biggest competitor in the power sector was BICC, an established cable manufacturer; during 1969, Power Securities, which by owned Balfour Beatty at that time, was taken over by BICC.

Throughout the 1970s, Balfour Beatty expanded its presence in the road construction sector through schemes such as the M73 motorway and the Glasgow Inner Ring Road; however, the M1 motorway proved to be quite challenging to deliver. The business also continued its involvement in the energy sector, like the Anglo-Dutch Offshore Concrete venture for the North Sea oil industry, along with an increasing focus upon large overseas projects, such as Port of Jebel Ali in Dubai and the erection of the longest high voltage lines in the western hemisphere in Argentina. Also during this time Balfour Beatty was involved in an early effort to construct the Channel Tunnel, although the project was cancelled on political grounds.

In 1986, Balfour Beatty began to move away from its traditional area of expertise when it formed Balfour Beatty Homes, building on a modest scale from its office in Nottingham. It also opened offices in Paisley and Leatherhead, and in 1987, it bought the Derbyshire firm of David M Adams to give it an annualised production rate of up to 700 houses. During the late 1980s, Balfour Beatty secured its role in the construction of the Channel Tunnel, which would be completed in 1994.

In October 1994, a tunnel collapsed during construction of the Heathrow Express tunnel at Heathrow Airport. It led to the subsidence of a surface building and three large surface craters. The investigation into the collapse led to a six-month delay in opening and additional costs of around £150 million. Tunnelling contractor Balfour Beatty and designer Geoconsult were subsequently fined a total of £1.7M – a then record for offences under health and safety legislation.

During the early 1990s, through its parent BICC, Clarke Homes was purchased. However, this acquisition came barely one year prior to a collapse of the housing market. By the middle of the 1990s, sales were down to only five hundred per year, and although no financial figures were ever published, the housing operation was believed to have suffered heavy losses. Balfour Beatty Homes was renamed Clarke Homes and then sold to Westbury in 1995.

=== 21st century ===
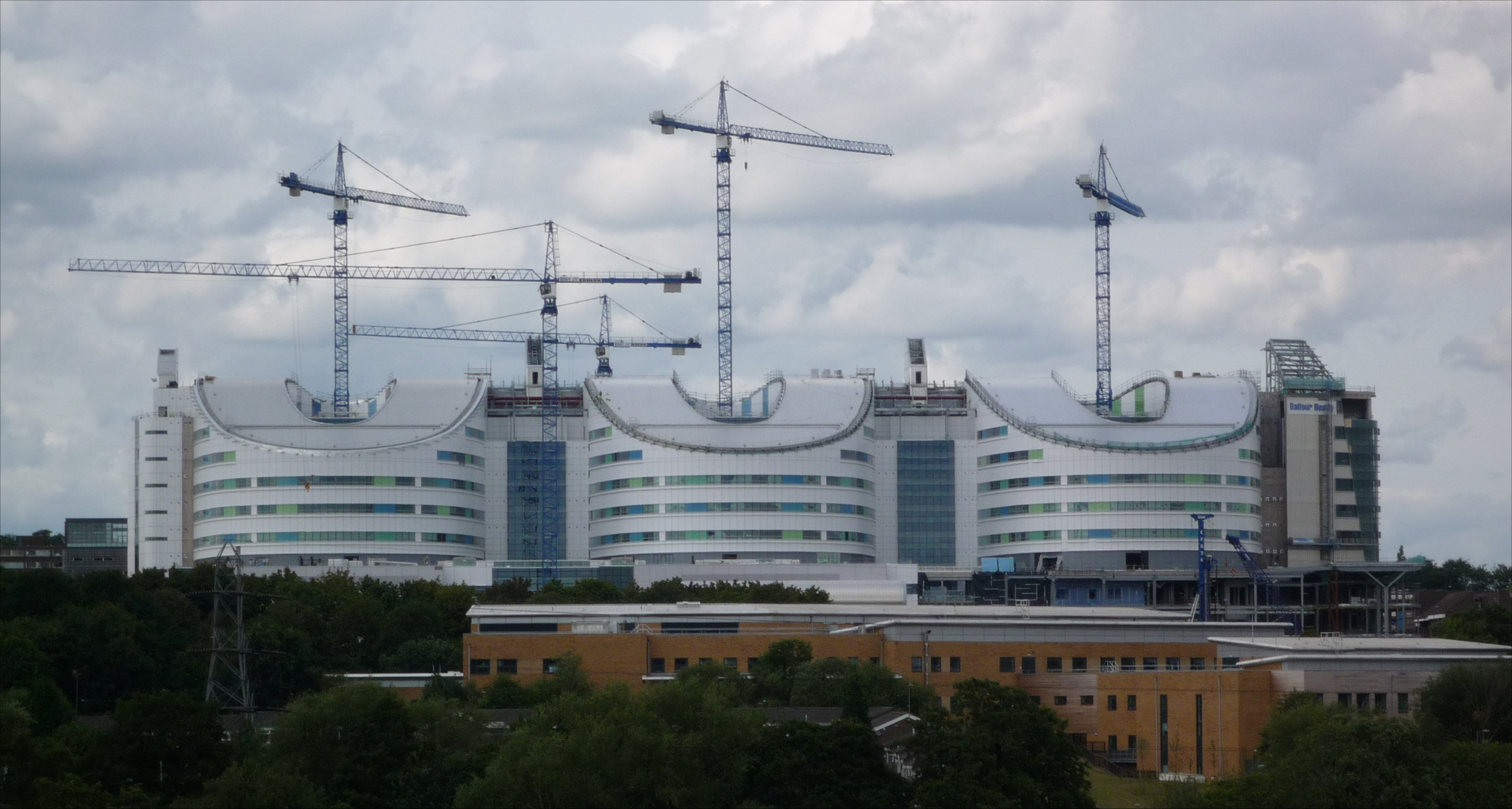
The Queen Elizabeth Hospital, Birmingham under construction by Balfour Beatty

In May 2000, BICC, having sold its cable operations, renamed itself Balfour Beatty. Beyond the name change, the company's business strategy shifted considerably; while it traditionally focused on the construction of infrastructure alone, Balfour Beatty diversified into the financing, operation, design and management functions as well. This change was accompanied by strong positive financial performance across the following decade. Between 2000 and 2010, the company's turnover increased sharply from £2bn to £10bn while the value of the business had reportedly increased four-fold.

Throughout the 2000s and 2010s, the company pursued a strategy of growth via acquisition, primarily in the United Kingdom and North America, partially as organic growth had been deemed to be too slow. During 2004, it also acquired Skanska's 50% stake in Hong Kong's Gammon Construction. Balfour Beatty's domestic acquisitions have included the construction services business Mansell plc for £42m in November 2003, construction and civils contractor Birse Group for £32m in August 2006, Bristol construction company Cowlin Construction, also in October 2007, and regional contractor Dean & Dyball for £45 million in February 2008. In November 2010, the company bought the remnant of collapsed construction company Rok plc for £7 million.

In February 2007, Balfour Beatty acquired Texas-based Centex Construction for £180m. In February 2008, the company bought GMH Military Housing, a United States–based military accommodation business, for £180m. In September 2009, the company agreed to buy Parsons Brinckerhoff, a project management firm based in the United States, for $626 million. Balfour Beatty sold Parsons Brinckerhoff to WSP Global for $1.24bn in October 2014. In October 2010, the company bought Halsall Group, a Canadian professional services firm, for £33 million.

In 2008, a 95% stake in Blackpool Airport was acquired. After being placed in administration in 2014, the stake was sold back to Blackpool City Council in September 2017.

In June 2011, it bought Howard S. Wright, one of the oldest contractors on the West Coast of the United States, for £58 million as well as Fru-Con Construction, a water and wastewater contractor based in the United States, for £12 million and in January 2013, it bought Subsurface Group, a consulting and engineering firm based in the United States.

==== Rail sector ====
Balfour Beatty was a part of the Metronet consortium that was founded in 1999 to bid for PPP contracts. Metronet successfully bid for two 30-year contracts that covered multiple London Underground lines under which it was responsible for the maintenance, renewal, and upgrade of the infrastructure (track, trains, tunnels, signals, and stations) on a total of nine Underground lines. The consortium preferred to award contracts to its own shareholders, for example rolling stock contracts to Bombardier Transportation, although this closed shop supply chain approach was later criticised for causing high costs.

On 18 July 2007, the company was placed into administration. In May 2008, the company's responsibilities were transferred back into public ownership under the authority of Transport for London (TfL). To enable its business activities to be kept going while the winding-up of the company was in progress, the British Government provided Metronet with £2 billion in 2008.

In 2000, Balfour Beatty purchased Adtranz's rail electrification and power business. In 2004, Bombardier Transportation's UK Solid State Interlocking signalling resources business was purchased.

During 2011, Balfour Beatty sold its trackwork manufacturing business to Progress Rail. In the following year, SSL, a joint venture between Balfour Beatty and the French railway manufacturer Alstom, was awarded several signaling-related contracted cumulatively valued at €43m. During 2015, the company withdrew from a railway electrification scheme valued at £75m after acknowledging it would not be completed to schedule or within budget. In June 2019, Balfour Beatty opened its new Rail Innovation Centre in Derby.

Throughout the 2010s and 2020s, Balfour Beatty has been heavily involved in several major railway projects in Britain, including High Speed 2, Crossrail, and the modernisation of the Great Western Main Line. International railway projects the company has been involved in have included the electrification of Caltrain in California.

In 2024, Balfour Beatty purchased two Class 20 diesel locomotives from Harry Needle Railroad Company for use with company's drain cleaning train.

==== Rebuffed merger ====
In August 2014, the company rebuffed three offers by its rival in the United Kingdom, Carillion, for the two companies to merge. The last bid, which valued Balfour Beatty at £2.1 billion, was unanimously rejected by the Balfour Beatty board on 20 August 2014, one day before a deadline for negotiations to conclude. Balfour refused to allow an extension of time for negotiations which could have prompted a fourth bid. Carillion subsequently announced it would no longer pursue a merger with its rival.

== Controversies ==
=== Hatfield rail crash ===
In October 2005, Balfour Beatty was found guilty of breaching health and safety laws, and were fined £10 million for its involvement in the October 2000 Hatfield rail crash. The crash resulted in the death of four people, and injured more than 70.

=== Blacklisting ===
In March 2009, the company was found to be a subscriber to the Consulting Association, a firm which was then prosecuted by the UK Information Commissioner's Office for breaching the Data Protection Act by holding a secret database of construction workers details, including union membership and political affiliations, and six enforcement notices were issued against Balfour Beatty companies.

In January 2010, individual workers had started suing the company for being on the blacklist; the first of these cases, however, was ruled in favour of the company.

On 10 October 2013, Balfour Beatty was one of eight construction firms involved in blacklisting that apologised for their actions and agreed to pay compensation to affected workers. The eight businesses established the Construction Workers Compensation Scheme in July 2014, though the scheme was condemned as a "PR stunt" by the GMB union, and as "an act of bad faith" by Parliament's Scottish Affairs Select Committee.

A High Court case regarding the blacklisting was scheduled for May 2016. In October 2015, during preliminary stages of the case, the eight firms did not accept the loss of earnings that the blacklisting victims had suffered, but, in January 2016, they increased their compensation offers.

On 22 January 2016, the High Court ordered 30 construction firms to disclose all emails and correspondence relating to blacklisting by 12 February 2016, after it emerged that Balfour Beatty managers had referred to blacklisted workers as ‘sheep’. However, some settlements were eventually agreed, and on 11 May 2016, a 'formal apology' from the 40 firms involved was read out in court and the case (Various Claimants v McAlpine & Ors) was closed.

In December 2017, Unite announced it had issued high court proceedings relating to blacklisting against twelve major contractors, including Balfour Beatty.

=== Late payment ===
In April 2019, Balfour Beatty was suspended from the UK Government's Prompt Payment Code, for failing to pay suppliers on time. It was reinstated around 10 months later.

=== Military housing ===
In December 2021, Balfour Beatty Communities LLC, one of the largest providers of privatized military housing to the U.S. Armed Forces, pleaded guilty to one count of major fraud against the United States. The company was sentenced to pay over $33.6 million in criminal fines and over $31.8 million in restitution to the U.S. military, serve three years probation, and engage an independent compliance monitor for three years. A small number of company employees lied about repairs made to housing for U.S. service members which enabled the company to collect performance bonuses to which it was not entitled.

In July 2026, the Daily Press reported that housing owned by Balfour Beatty on Joint Expeditionary Base Little Creek–Fort Story had unsafe levels of mold, leading to one family needing to move out of their home due to the negative health effects. Balfour Beatty denied that the home in question had any mold present, despite an independent investigator hired by the family finding unsafe levels of mold in the home. One member of the family visited the emergency room three times during the time she lived in the house. A maintenance request sent to Balfour Beatty for mold testing was not accepted. The family eventually needed to move into a trailer park, despite their entire military housing allowance continuing to go towards the house, which they no longer live in.

== Operations ==
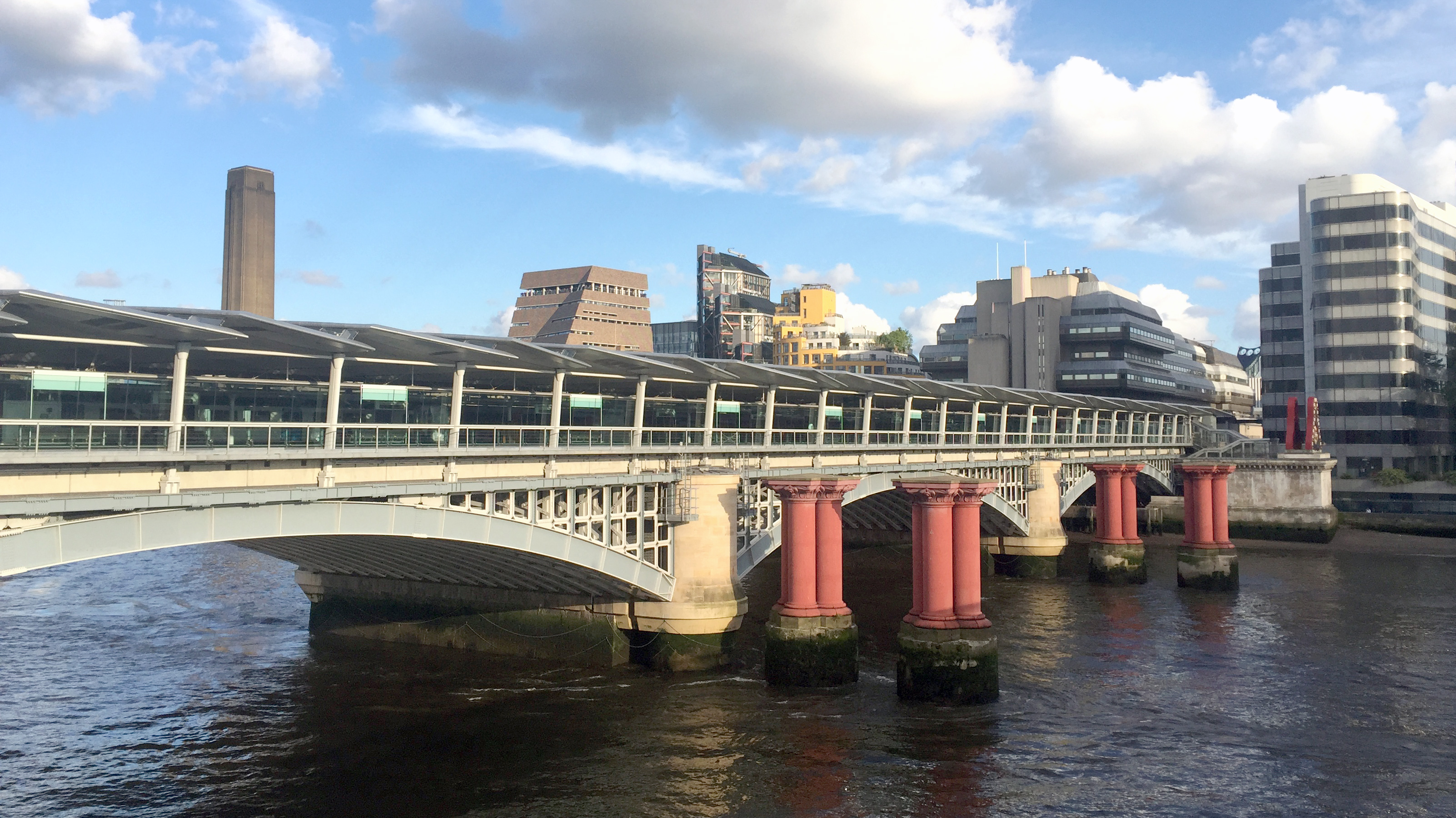
Blackfriars station redevelopment, London, carried out by Balfour Beatty

Balfour Beatty is an international infrastructure group. They finance, develop, build and maintain infrastructure. Its capabilities include:

- Construction services: Civil engineering, building, ground engineering, M&E, refurbishment, fit-out and rail engineering
- Support services: electricity networks, rail and highways
- Infrastructure investments: A portfolio of long term (public–private partnership, 'PPP') concessions in the United Kingdom, primarily in the education, health and roads/street lighting sectors, plus a portfolio of long term military and multi-family housing, and student accommodation assets in the United States. Balfour Beatty also has interests in non PPP assets in the United Kingdom.

Balfour Beatty is a member of several industry and trade bodies, associations and institutions. These include, for example, the CECA, the Nuclear Industry Association, the Rail Industry Association and Women into Construction.

== Notable projects ==
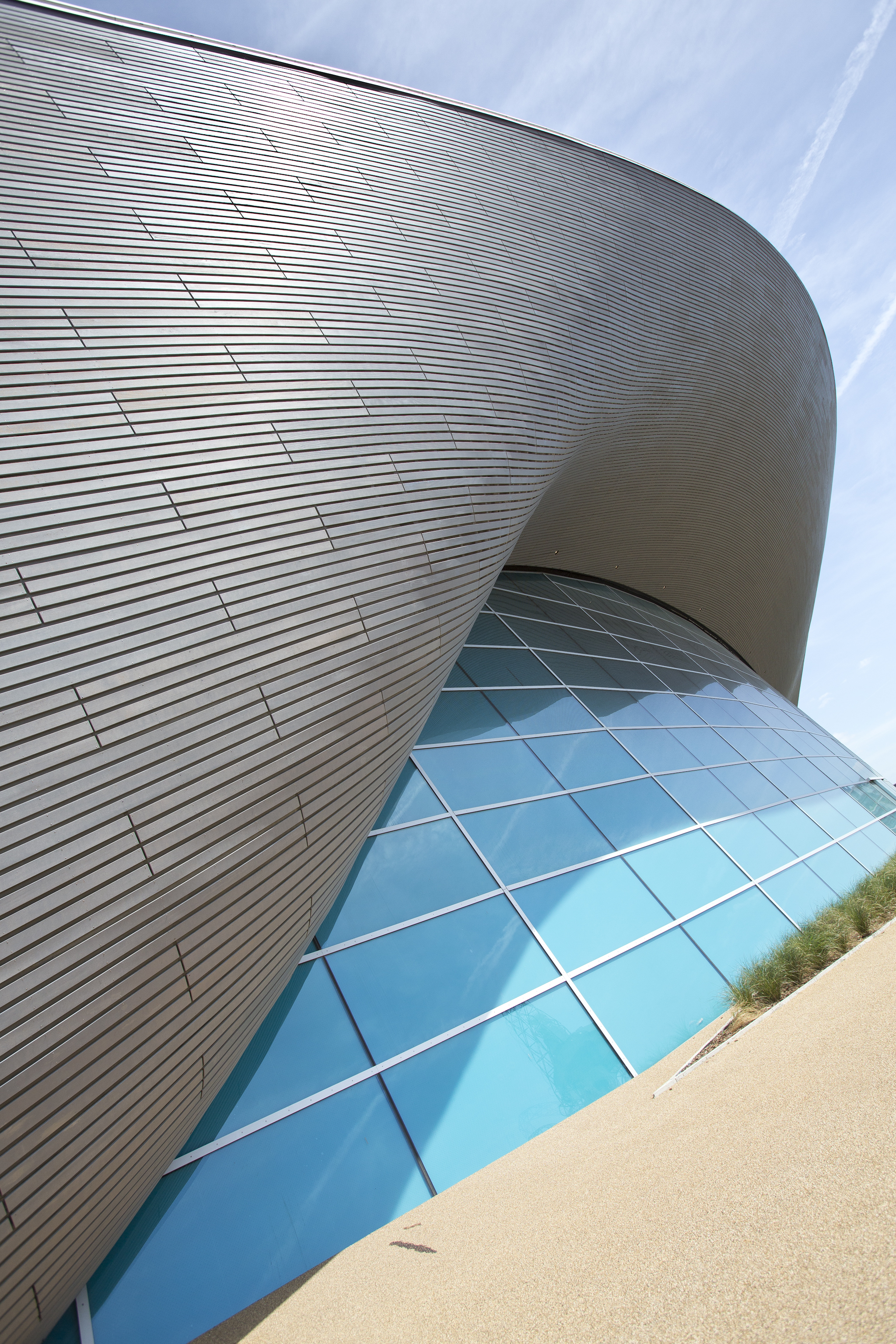
London Aquatics Centre built by Balfour Beatty

Projects involving Balfour Beatty include:

- The Kut Barrage, Iraq, completed in 1939
- The Churchill Barriers, Orkney, completed in 1940-44
- The Kielder Dam, Northumberland, completed in 1982
- The Docklands Light Railway in London, completed in 1985
- Large parts of the M25 motorway around London, completed in 1986
- Sheffield Supertram, completed in 1994
- The Channel Tunnel, completed in 1994
- The Cardiff Bay Barrage, completed in 1999
- The University Hospital of North Durham, completed in 2001
- The Lesotho Highlands Water Project, completed in 2002
- Nam Cheong station, Hong Kong, completed in 2003
- The Pergau Dam hydroelectric project in Malaysia, completed in 2003
- The M6 Toll, completed in 2003
- New facilities for the Royal Infirmary of Edinburgh, completed in 2003
- University College London Hospital, completed in 2005
- Igor I. Sikorsky Memorial Bridge, Connecticut, USA, completed in 2006
- Royal Blackburn Teaching Hospital, completed in 2006
- Dubai Mall, completed in 2008
- The United States Capitol Visitor Center, completed in 2008
- The King's Cross St Pancras tube station Northern Ticket Hall, completed in 2009
- Tameside General Hospital, completed in 2009
- Redevelopment of Stobhill Hospital in Glasgow, completed in 2009
- The Caernarfon Criminal Justice Centre, completed in 2009
- Queen Elizabeth Hospital Birmingham near Selly Oak, Birmingham, completed in 2010
- Pinderfields Hospital in Wakefield, completed in 2010
- Pontefract Hospital, completed in 2010
- The East London line, completed in 2010
- The A3 Hindhead Tunnel, completed in 2011
- The London Aquatics Centre, completed in 2011
- The M25 motorway widening J16 to 23 and J27 to 30, completed in 2012
- Extension to the Victoria Hospital in Kirkcaldy, completed in 2012
- The Blackfriars station and Bridge Construction Works, completed in 2012
- The rebuilding of Salford Royal Hospital, completed in 2012
- The new main facility for Parkland Memorial Hospital in Dallas, Texas, completed in 2014
- The M4/M5 Managed Motorways project in Bristol, completed in 2014
- Providence Tower, London, completed in 2015
- British Columbia Women's and Children's Hospital Acute Care Centre, Vancouver, Canada, completed in 2017
- Aberdeen Western Peripheral Route, completed in 2019
- Crossrail Liverpool Street station and Whitechapel station tunnels project, completed in 2020
- Green Line Extension, in Cambridge, Somerville, and Medford, Massachusetts, completed in 2021
- The expansion of Whitechapel station for Crossrail completed in 2021
- The Viking Power Link between Denmark and the UK, completed in 2023
- Western section of Thames Tideway Scheme in London, completed in 2025
- Central Kowloon Route in Hong Kong due to complete in 2025
- SkyLink in Los Angeles, California, due to complete in 2026
- Hinkley Point C nuclear power station, Somerset due to complete in 2027
- Old Oak Common Station due to complete in 2030
- HS2 lots N1 and N2, working as part of joint venture, due to complete in 2031
