= HWD Hospital Radio =

Coordinates: 53.701013°N 1.651257°W

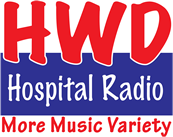

England
- Broadcast area: Mid Yorkshire Trust hospitals (Dewsbury, Pontefract and Castleford)
- Frequency: Online

Programming
- Format: Contemporary

History
- First air date: 1952

Links
- Website: HWD Hospital Radio

HWD Hospital Radio is a hospital radio station which broadcasts to the patients and staff of Mid Yorkshire Trust hospitals in West Yorkshire, England. The station is a member of the Hospital Broadcasting Association and is registered as a charity with the Charity Commission for England and Wales, number 227515.

== History ==
HWD Hospital Radio is the broadcasting name of the Heavy Woollen District Hospitals Broadcasts Association. The station's first broadcast was live commentary of a rugby match at Batley’s Mount Pleasant Stadium in 1952. It received so many compliments that commentaries began to be broadcast on a more regular basis.

The former Batley General Hospital

Record requests began in the late 1950s when the station set up a studio in the attic of Batley General Hospital. From there it broadcast to the former Dewsbury General Hospital, Staincliffe Hospital and five care homes across the Heavy Woollen District.

In the 1980s, the National Health Service announced plans to build a new hospital to replace Batley General Hospital, Dewsbury General Hospital and Staincliffe Hospital. HWD Hospital Radio moved to a brand-new studio complex at the newly built Dewsbury and District Hospital in 1989, where it remains to this day. The studios were officially opened on 23 November 1989 by Harry Gration of BBC Look North.

HWD Hospital Radio has extended and refurbished its studio complex over the years to include the latest digital technology. The station broadcasts 24 hours a day online, through its website.

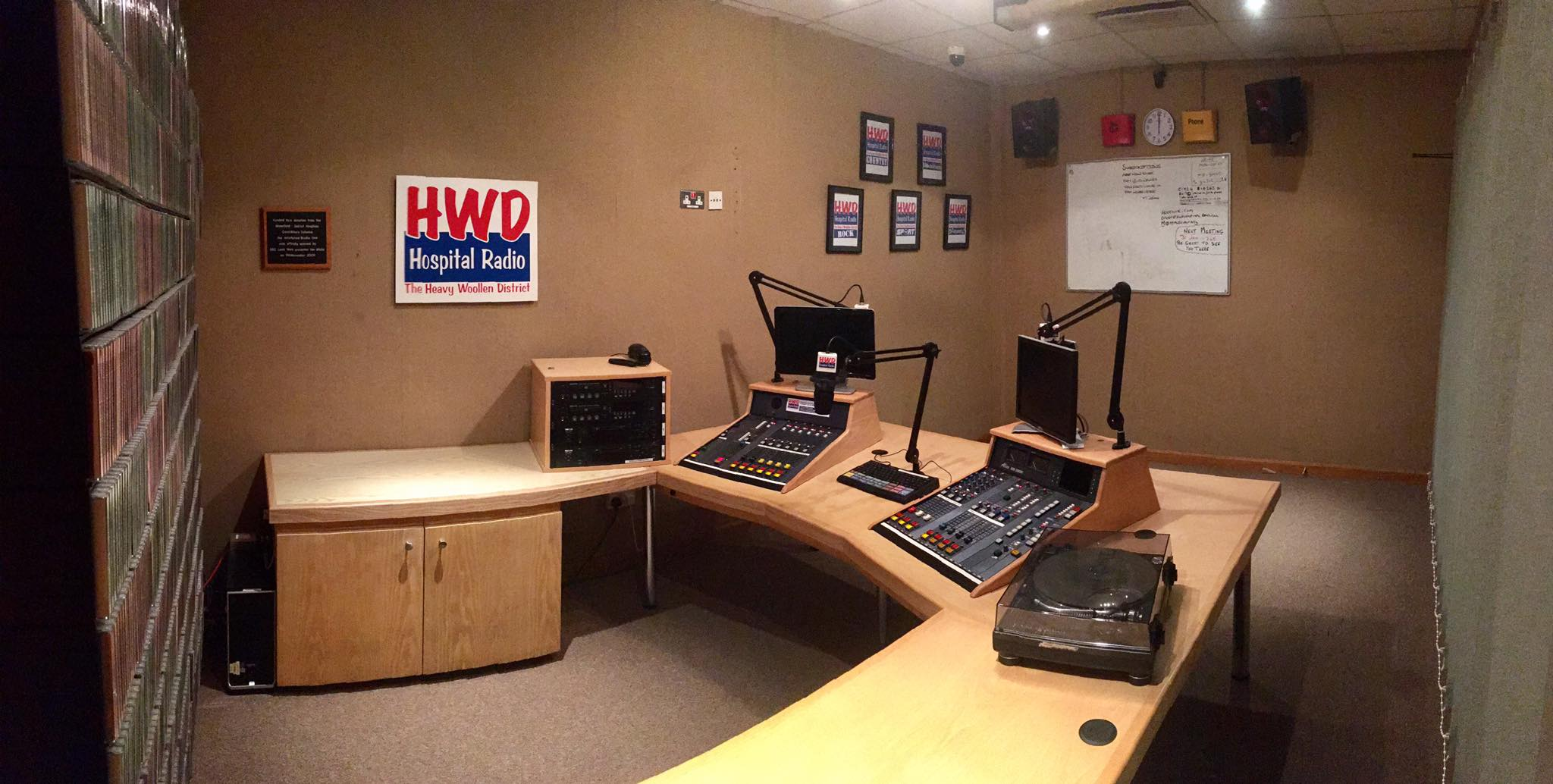
Studio One at HWD Hospital Radio

A wide variety of programmes are broadcast covering a range of genres as well as sports commentary, entertainment and news. Listener participation is welcomed and encouraged. The ever-popular Sunday morning request show, You Pick the Mix, is open for patients and their relatives to select the music played.

Towards the end of 2016, HWD Hospital Radio began work to refurbish its main on air studio. This work was completed in February 2017. On 30 March 2017, actress, television writer and Labour Co-operative MP for Batley and Spen, Tracy Brabin, officially opened the refurbished studio, along with Martin Barkley; Chief Executive of the Mid Yorkshire Hospitals NHS Trust.
