= Dewsbury and District Hospital =

- Mid Yorkshire Teaching NHS Trust
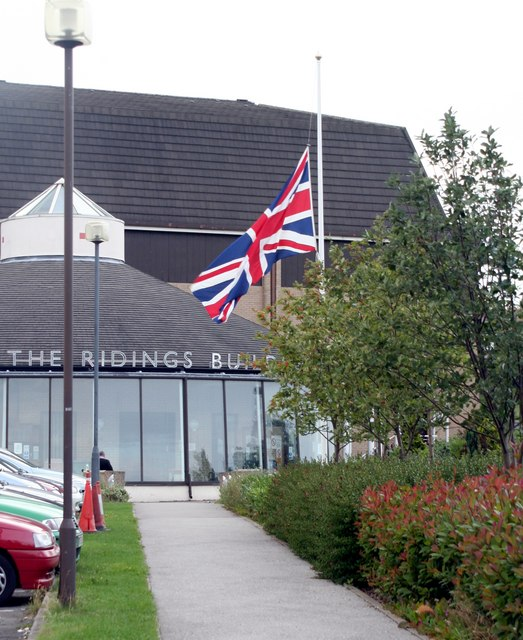
- Dewsbury and District Hospital

- Location in West Yorkshire

Geography
- Location: Dewsbury, West Yorkshire, England
- Coordinates: 53.70247°N 1.65081°W

Organisation
- Care system: NHS

Services
- Emergency department: Yes

History
- Founded: 1876

Links
- Website: www.midyorks.nhs.uk
- Lists: Hospitals in England

Dewsbury and District Hospital is an acute District General Hospital in Staincliffe, West Yorkshire operated by the Mid Yorkshire Teaching NHS Trust.

== History ==
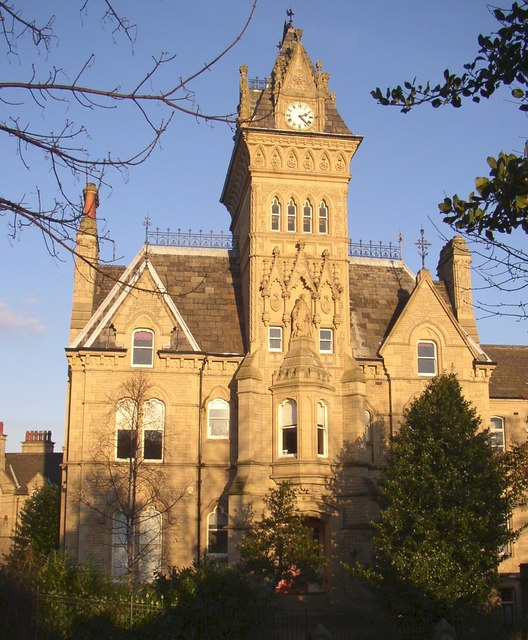
The old Dewsbury Infirmary on the Halifax Road

The original hospital in Dewsbury was known as the Dewsbury Infirmary and it opened in temporary accommodation at Northgate in 1876.

The infirmary moved to a more permanent home on the Halifax Road in 1883: the distinctive new building was designed in the gothic revival style by Kirk & Sons of Dewsbury. After the infirmary had left the site, this building was taken over by the West Riding County Council and was renamed the "Municipal Buildings" and more recently has simply become known as "Boothroyds".

Instead, in 1930, the infirmary moved to Moorlands Road where it became known as Dewsbury and District General Infirmary. After the infirmary had left the Moorlands Road site, the hospital buildings there were demolished to make way for housing.

The present hospital was established on the Dewsbury Union workhouse site at Healds Road in Staincliffe in 1980; the facility was originally known as the Staincliffe General Hospital but is now known as "Dewsbury and District Hospital".

It was announced in August 2017 that the accident and emergency department at the hospital would be downgraded in status to that of an urgent care centre with patients with life-threatening injuries being sent for treatment at Pinderfields Hospital in Wakefield instead.
