= Chequerfield =

Area of Pontefract, West Yorkshire, England

Coordinates: 53.691°N 1.312°W

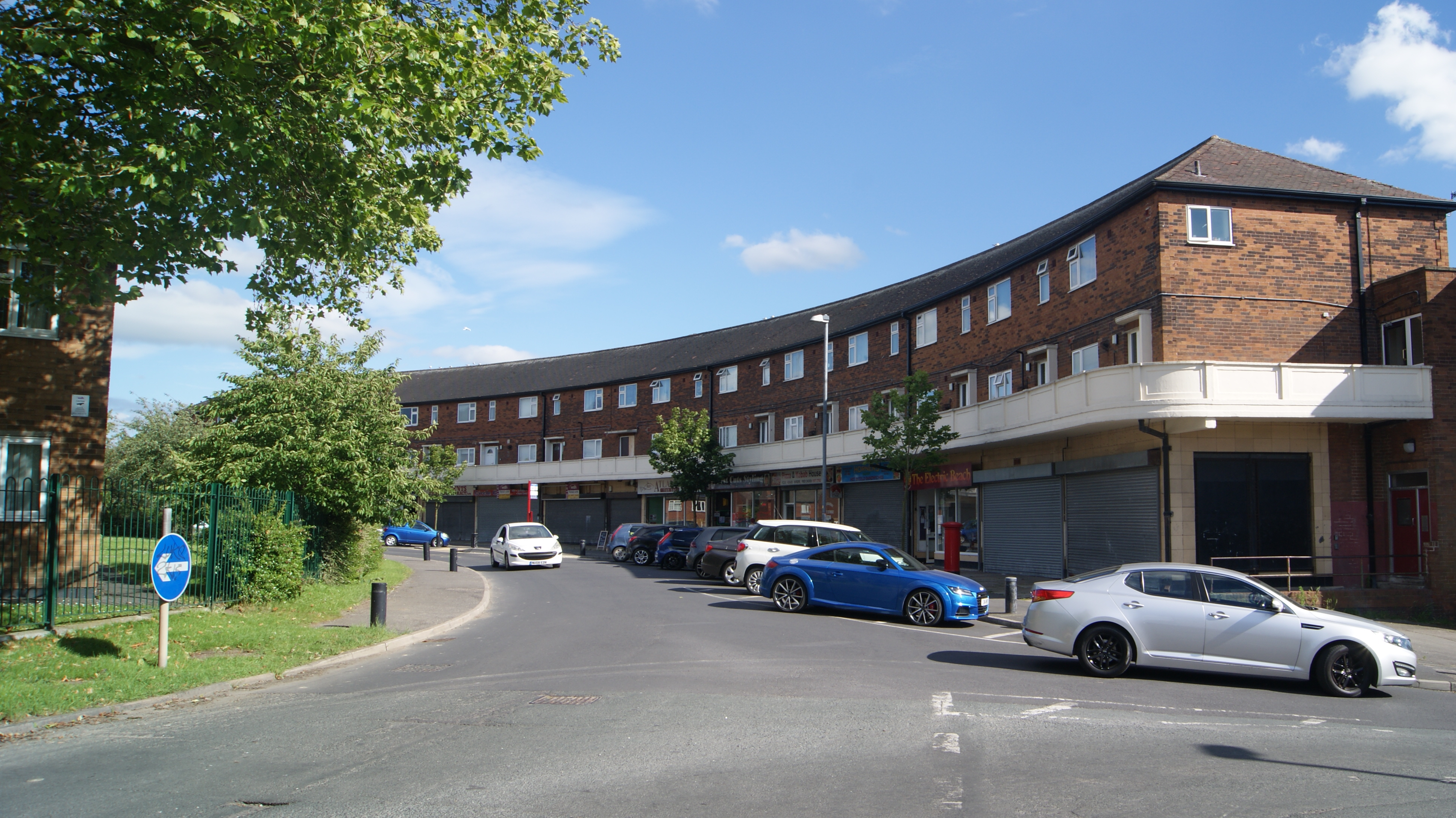
- Chequerfield Circle

- Location within West Yorkshire
- OS grid reference: SE455215
  - London: 257 mi (414 km)
- Metropolitan borough: City of Wakefield
- Metropolitan county: West Yorkshire
- Region: Yorkshire and the Humber
- Country: England
- Sovereign state: United Kingdom
- Post town: PONTEFRACT
- Postcode district: WF8
- Dialling code: 01977
- Police: West Yorkshire
- Fire: West Yorkshire
- Ambulance: Yorkshire
- UK Parliament: Normanton, Pontefract and Castleford

Chequerfield is a district made up mostly of council housing of Pontefract, West Yorkshire, England.

== Amenities ==
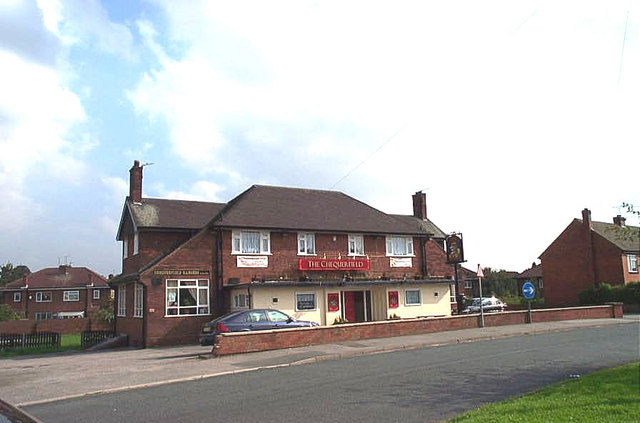
Chequerfield Hotel

The estate has a parade of shops situated around Chequerfield Circle; which includes a convenience store, fish and chip shop and several takeaways. There is one pub; the Chequerfield Hotel also situated on the Circle. Pontefract Sports and Social Club, formerly known as the Labour Club is situated on the edge of the estate. There where two churches on the estate; St Mary's Church of England church and Holy Family Roman Catholic Church (completed 1961), however St Mary's Church has been demolished and a new building called St Mary's Community Centre now occupies its place. A care facility occupies the centre of the Circle. The is also a green area known locally as the 'Ozzy', the former site of an infectious diseases hospital. There are two schools; Pontefract De Lacy Primary School which was built on land adjacent to the old Willow Park Primary School and Hopewell School which was formerly Chequerfield Infants. There was formerly a second pub called the Grove Lea but this is now a Tesco Express. One property of note is 30 East Drive, which is reportedly haunted by the Black Monk of Pontefract and was the feature in the film When the lights went out.

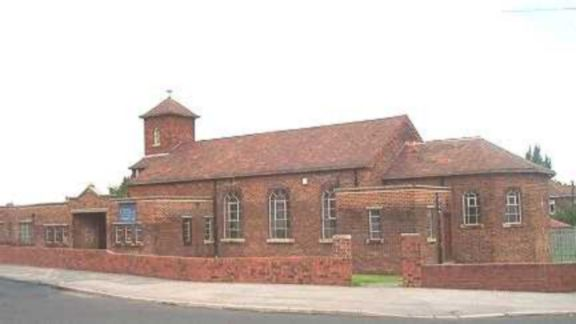
St Mary's Church

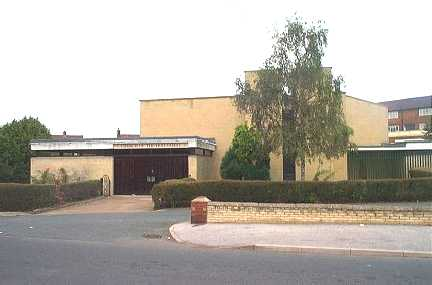
Holy Family Church

== Public transport ==
The Arriva Yorkshire routes 410 and 411 connect the estate with Pontefract bus station, Xscape and Leeds. The closest railway station is Pontefract Baghill with services to Sheffield and York. The main railway stations in the town have services to Wakefield, Castleford and Leeds but these are situated further away.

== People ==
- Author Patricia Duffy grew up on the estate and wrote the book Chequerfield about her upbringing on the estate.
