= Pinderfields Hospital =

- Mid Yorkshire Teaching NHS Trust
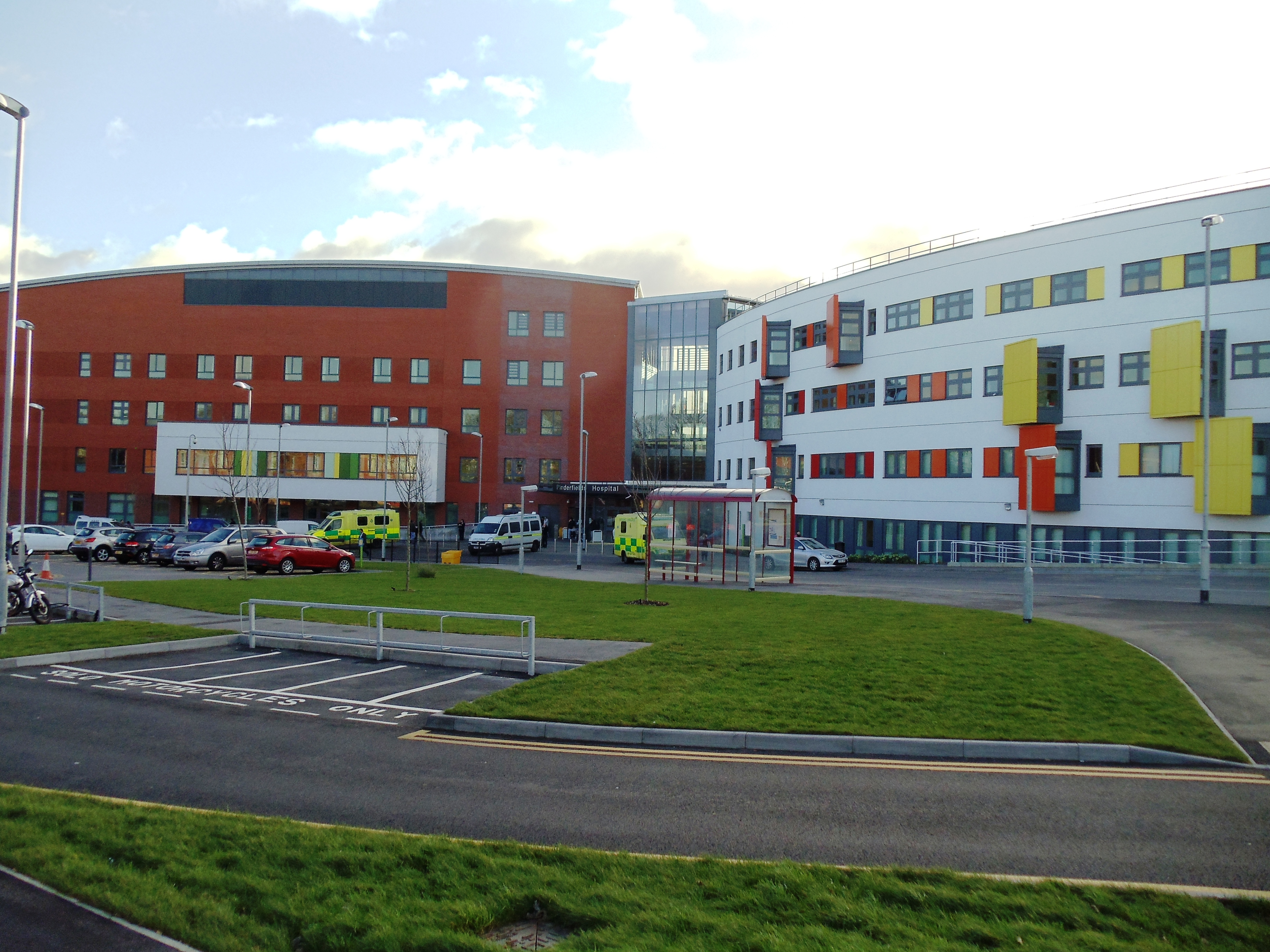
- The new Pinderfields Hospital

- Location in West Yorkshire

Geography
- Location: Wakefield, West Yorkshire, England
- Coordinates: 53.69349°N 1.48998°W

Organisation
- Care system: NHS

Services
- Emergency department: Yes - Trauma Unit
- Beds: 1040

History
- Founded: 2010

Links
- Website: www.midyorks.nhs.uk
- Lists: Hospitals in England

Pinderfields Hospital is an acute District General Hospital in Wakefield, West Yorkshire operated by the Mid Yorkshire Teaching NHS Trust.

== History ==
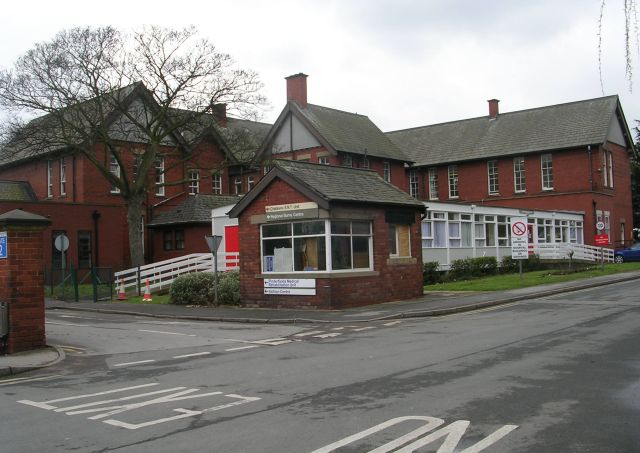
The old Pinderfields Hospital

The original acute hospital in Wakefield was established as part of the Stanley Royd Hospital and opened on 8 March 1900. It was briefly renamed Wakefield Emergency Hospital before becoming Pinderfields General Hospital in the 1940s. Harold Balme was officer-in-charge of the hospital when it was one of two major rehabilitation hospitals during the Second World War.

The name derives from the Pinder of Wakefield, the townsmen in charge of impounding stray animals who were tasked with ensuring that no-one dare trespass on Wakefield under their watchful eyes.

A new hospital, to be known as the Pinderfields Hospital, was procured under a Private Finance Initiative contract to replace Pinderfields General Hospital in 2007. The new hospital, which was designed by the Building Design Partnership and built by Balfour Beatty, cost around £150 million. It was completed in June 2010. and was opened by the Princess Royal in September 2011.

In January 2018, with overcrowding becoming a serious issue at many hospitals, patients were pictured sleeping on the bare floors of Pinderfields Hospital.
