= Wardian =

Wardian may refer to:

== People ==
- Michael Wardian (born 1974), American marathoner and ultra-marathoner.

== Places ==
- Wardian London, a building in London, United Kingdom.

== Other ==
- Wardian case, a protective container for plants.
