= Phoenix Heights =

Residential tower block in Millwall, London

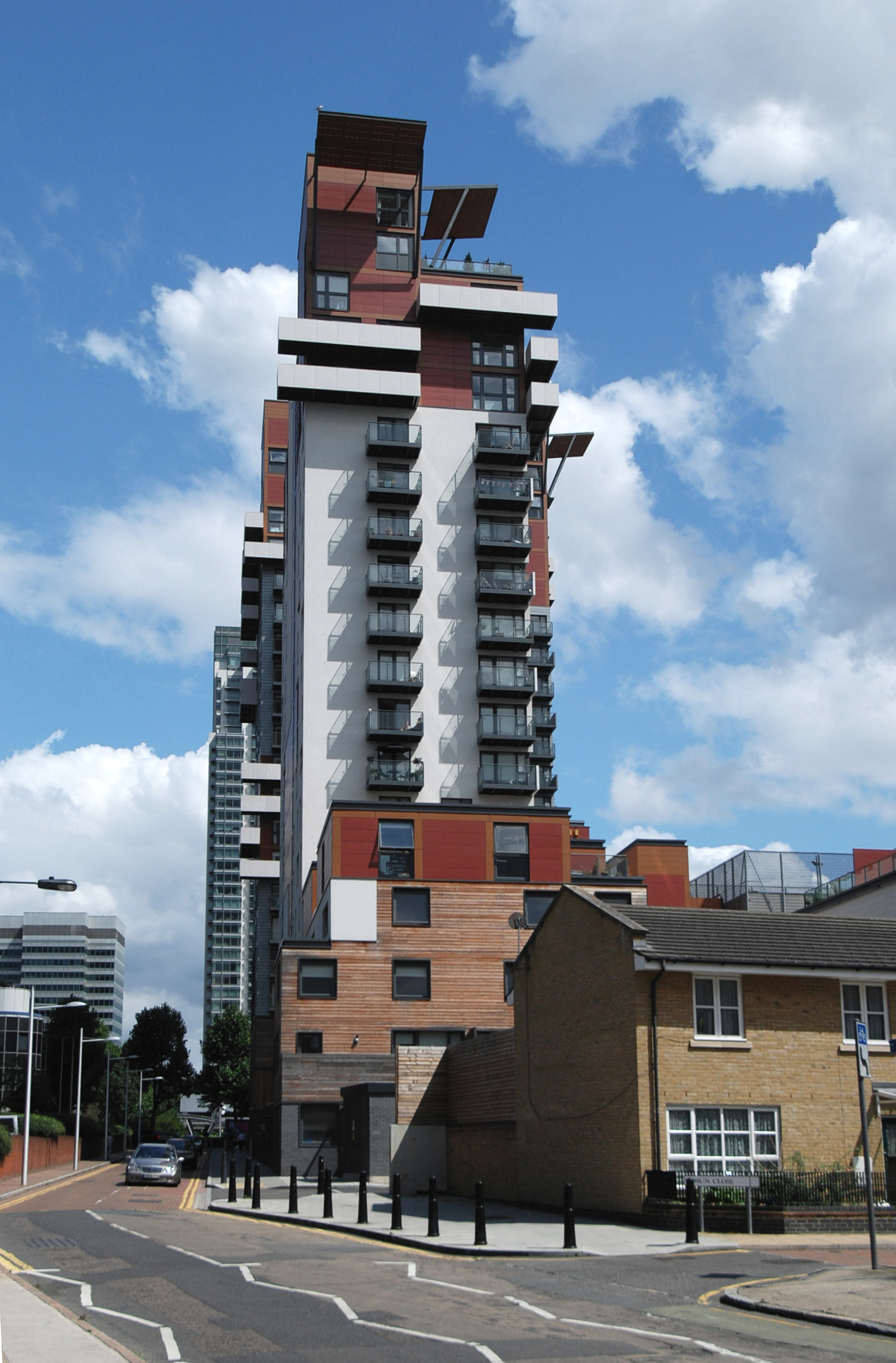
- Interactive map of the Phoenix Heights area

General information
- Type: mixed tenure residential
- Location: London, E14; United Kingdom
- Coordinates: 51.5003°N 0.0219°W
- Construction started: 2007
- Completed: 2009
- Opening: December 2009
- Management: One Housing Group

Height
- Roof: 65 m (213 ft) (East Tower); 54 m (177 ft) (West Tower)

Technical details
- Floor count: 23 (East Tower); 21 (West Tower)

Design and construction
- Architect: Brady Mallalieu Architects
- Developer: Ballymore
- Structural engineer: Walsh Associates
- Services engineer: Hoare Lea
- Main contractor: Ballymore

Phoenix Heights, also known as 4 Mastmaker Road, is a mixed tenure residential development in the Millwall area of London, near to South Quay DLR station. It forms a social housing commitment developed as part of the nearby Pan Peninsula project.

== Design ==
Phoenix Heights consists of 199 mixed tenure homes with integral community areas significantly having a high proportion of family homes with access to outdoor space in such a high-density location.

The development varies in height from 3 to 23 storeys negotiating an abrupt shift in urban scale from the Barkantine Estate to the West with the emerging Millennium Quarter to the East. Family-sized units are located at the base of the building having direct access to rear gardens, a playground and communal courtyard areas. Smaller sized units are located higher up in the towers enjoying views across London from roof terraces and balconies. A community space was designed as an integral part of the project and incorporates a rooftop sports pitch. The development makes use of a local 'Combined Heat and Power' system and includes greenwalls, bird boxes, bat boxes, insect bricks and biodiversity roofs to help develop local eco-systems. The distinctive skyline and elevations of the building include coloured fibre cement cladding panels, large overhanging canopies and projecting balconies which contrast with the restrained aesthetic of Canary Wharf. Piers Gough described the development as 'humanist architecture of raw funky collage'.

The project was designed by Brady Mallalieu Architects and was developed by the Irish property firm Ballymore. The social and shared ownership housing was managed by the housing association One Housing which subsequently acquired the freehold in 2016.

The building won a 2010 Royal Institute of the Architects of Ireland (RIAI) award for 'Best Overseas Project' and an Evening Standard Award for 'Best New Development in the Affordable Homes Sector'. The project was shortlisted for 'Best New Place to Live' at the 2009 RTPI London Planning Awards and Best Residential Building of the Year at the 2010 Leaf Awards.

== See also ==
- Riverside South (Canary Wharf)
- Tall buildings in London
