= Ontario Tower =

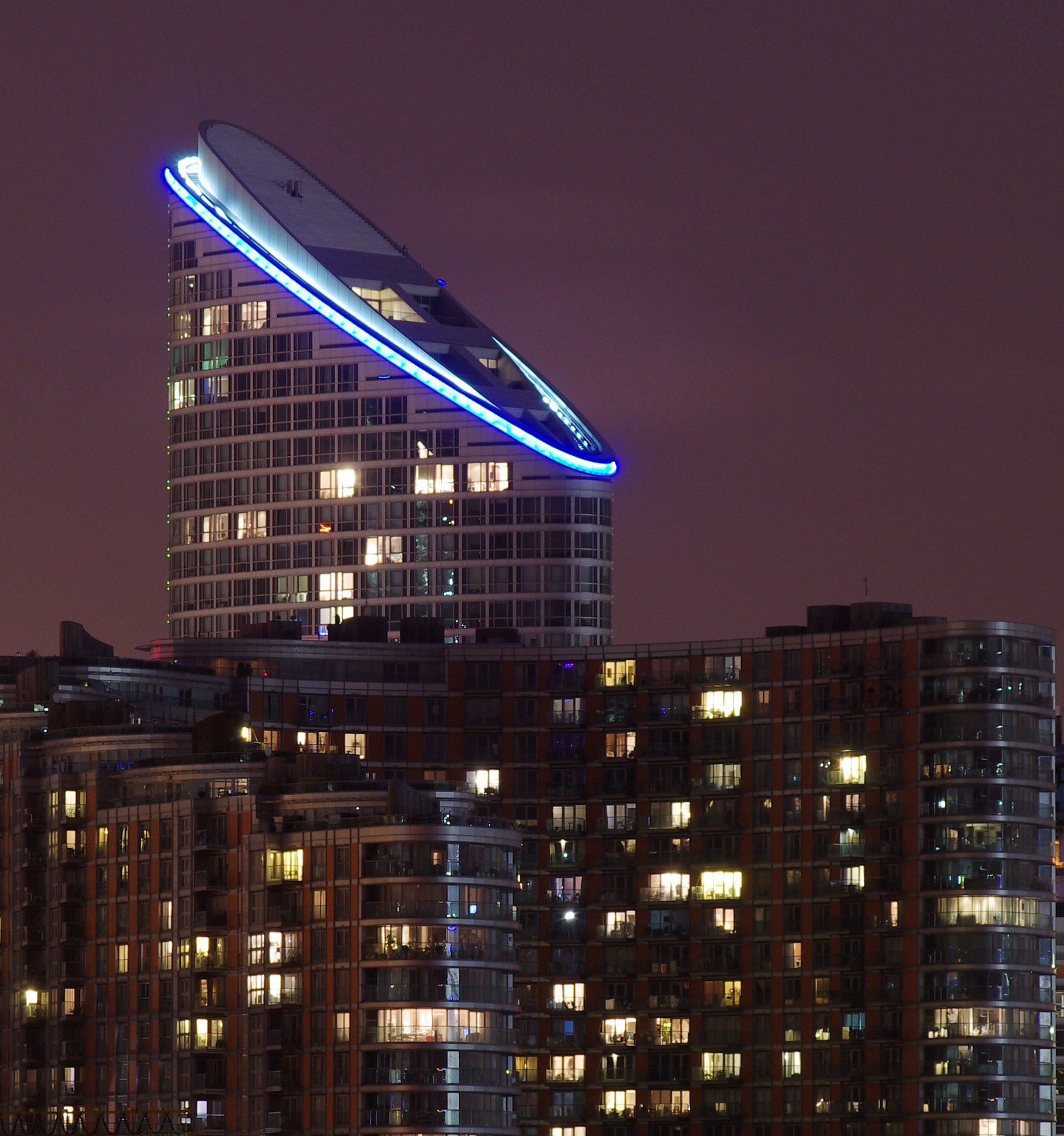
- Interactive map of the Ontario Tower area

General information
- Status: Completed
- Type: Residential
- Location: London, E14; United Kingdom
- Coordinates: 51.5067°N 0.00469°W
- Opening: 2006
- Operator: Ballymore Asset Management

Height
- Roof: 104 m (341 ft)

Technical details
- Floor count: 32
- Lifts/elevators: 3

Design and construction
- Architect: Skidmore, Owings and Merrill
- Developer: Ballymore Group

The Ontario Tower, located in Blackwall in the former docklands area of east London, is a residential housing block in the New Providence Wharf development on the north side of the River Thames.

It was built by property development company Ballymore and designed by architects Skidmore, Owings and Merrill. The Ontario Tower is a primarily glass and aluminium design. Its roof is sloped, with a blue LED-rimmed elliptical profile.

Construction began in 2004 and was completed in 2006. The tower is 105.55m in height, has 32 floors and 256 apartments.
