= Charrington Tower =

Coordinates: 51°30′25.5″N 0°0′20.9″W

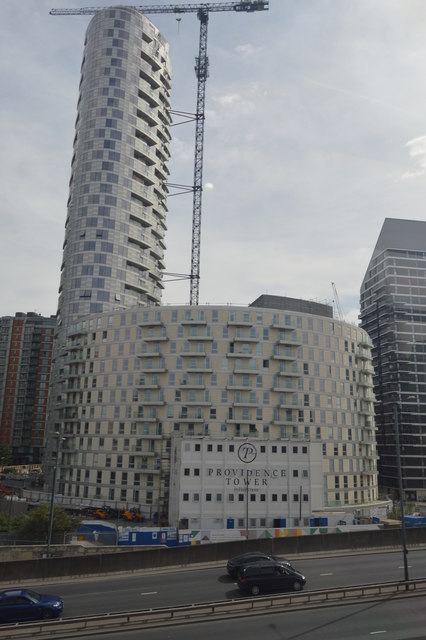
- Interactive map of the Charrington Tower area

General information
- Status: Completed
- Location: London, E14; United Kingdom
- Construction started: 2013
- Completed: 2016
- Client: Ballymore

Height
- Roof: 136 m (446 ft)

Technical details
- Floor count: 44

Design and construction
- Architects: Skidmore, Owings & Merrill
- Main contractor: Balfour Beatty

Website
- providencetower.com

Charrington Tower, originally called Providence Tower, is a 44-storey 136 m (446 ft) residential tower located in the New Providence Wharf development on the north side of the River Thames in the Blackwall area of east London, completed in 2016.

It was commissioned by the developer Ballymore, designed by the Skidmore, Owings & Merrill architecture firm, and built by Balfour Beatty. The project was announced in Singapore in June 2012, followed by "investor events" in Hong Kong and Singapore in September 2012.

In August 2024, a fire broke out on the 25th floor, destroying half of an apartment and its balcony.
