= Glenn Howells =

British architect

- Born: Stourbridge, UK
- Education: Plymouth School of Architecture
- Occupation: Architect
- Practice: Howells
- Buildings: Savill Building, English National Ballet, Gloucester Services, Westonbirt Arboretum, Rotunda, Wardian London, 125 Deansgate, Bramall Music Building
- Projects: Royal Wharf, London City Island, Eden Dock, Birmingham Future City Plan, Paradise Birmingham, Port Loop
- Website: www.howells.uk

Howells

Practice information
- Founded: 1990
- Location: Birmingham, London

Website
- www.howells.uk

Glenn Paul Howells (born 1961) is a British architect and a director and founder of Howells.

== Early life ==
Howells was born in Stourbridge, England and educated in Plymouth.

== Practice ==
His practice, Howells (formerly Glenn Howells Architects), has offices in Birmingham, London and Dublin. Howells founded his practice in London in 1990 but later moved the main office to Birmingham in 1992. The practice now employs 150 people in its studios and works across the UK and the Republic of Ireland in many sectors including masterplanning, residential, offices, education, retail, health, hotel and leisure. Howells' current role involves overseeing design of all projects, chairing the company's strategic board and giving direction to the practice in all three of its offices.

Early projects included the award-winning Custard Factory, an affordable creative business space in Birmingham for developer Bennie Gray and a series of arts projects including the Market Place Theatre in Armagh, Northern Ireland (which won a RIBA regional award) and the Courtyard Theatre in Hereford.

The practice subsequently expanded into residential and mixed-use regeneration schemes with a series of projects for innovative developer Urban Splash. These included Timber Wharf and Burton Place in Manchester and the remodeling of Birmingham's landmark Rotunda office building into residential use.

Among its public projects is the Savill Building at Windsor Great Park, shortlisted for the 2007 RIBA Stirling Prize. The competition winning scheme run by The Crown Estate, was intended to create a gateway to the listed gardens reflecting the character and quality of the park. The building grouped all visitor facilities under a grid shell roof creating a series of linked spaces. The roof is constructed from larch and clad with green oak from sustainable sources from the Windsor Estate. It is supported by an earth structure on the entrance side which houses ancillary facilities, while the garden side is elevated on legs to take advantage of the views. It opened to the public in June 2006.

Another key public project is the acclaimed English National Ballet at the Mulryan Centre for Dance, winner of the RIBA London Building of the Year 2021 and the Architects' Journal AJ100 Building of the Year 2020. This public-facing, purpose-built facility opens up to a civic square and invites the passers-by in through a ground-floor exhibition and café, which in turn opens up to an atrium that connects to all the levels with a feature stair.

Today, the practice is working on a number of large scale projects and masterplans including thousands of homes as part of the regeneration of London's former docks and the mixed-use redevelopment of the historically sensitive Paradise Circus area of central Birmingham for Argent. In addition, Howells are masterplanning Port Loop, a new canalside community in Birmingham for Urban Splash and Places for People.

The practice is continuing to work with developer Ballymore by masterplanning former brownfield sites along the River Thames such as Royal Wharf, Riverscape, London City Island in East London and Brentford Waterside in West London.

The practice's design approach was featured in an interview for the RIBA Journal in 2019. In 2018 Glenn Howells was appointed visiting professor at Birmingham City University in its School of Architecture and Design and was formerly chair of the Birmingham Hippodrome Board of Trustees. He is currently the Chair of the West Midlands Regional Advisory Board at the Canal & River Trust. He has acted as visiting professor to several universities including Nottingham Trent and Birmingham City University, as well as being the Chair of Estates Committee at the University of Warwick.

The practice rebranded from Glenn Howells Architects to Howells on 28 April 2023.

Howells has often pushed the development of young, local talent and engages with Birmingham teenagers at the practice's annual work experience programme.

== Awards ==
Howells' projects have won a diverse range of awards including those of the Royal Institute of British Architects National Awards, the Architects' Journal AJ100 Building of the Year Award, the Chicago Athenaeum International Architecture Award, the American Institute of Architects Award, the British Council for Offices, National Homebuilder, Housing Design and RICS awards, Civic Trust and Civic Voice awards, British Construction Industry Awards and Concrete Society and Brick Awards. In 2019 Glenn Howells was awarded the BCO Regional Committee Chair's Award in recognition of outstanding contribution to the regional property industry.

== Projects ==
Selected projects include:

Masterplanning - UK

- Birmingham Future City Plan
- Paradise, Birmingham,
- Martineau Galleries, Birmingham
- Curzon HS2 district
- Port Loop, Birmingham
- Shrewsbury Big Town Plan
- Milton Keynes Campbell Park and central area
- Wirral Waters Merseyside
- Derby City Centre

Masterplanning - London

- Royal Wharf, Royal Docks
- Canary Wharf Vision
- London City Island
- Blackwall Yard
- East Village Stratford
- Edgware

Masterplanning - international

- Sea Gardens, Bray, Ireland
- Xiong'an, China

Housing

- Brick House, Port Loop, Birmingham
- Timber Wharf, Manchester,
- Wardian, London

Workplace

- 125 Deansgate, Manchester
- One Centenary Way, Paradise, Birmingham
- One St Peter's Square, Manchester
- Two Chamberlain Square, Paradise, Birmingham

Public and Education

- Bramall Music Building, University of Birmingham, Birmingham
- English National Ballet at the Mulryan Centre for Dance, London
- National Memorial Arboretum, Alrewas, Staffordshire
- Savill Building, Windsor Great Park
- Westonbirt Aboretum, Tetbury
- Westonbirt Walkway, Westonbirt Arboretum, Tetbury
- Eden Dock Canary Wharf

Retail and Leisure

- Gloucester Services, Gloucester
