= Blackwall, London =

Area of the East End of London, England

Coordinates: 51.5063°N 0.0034°W

Blackwall
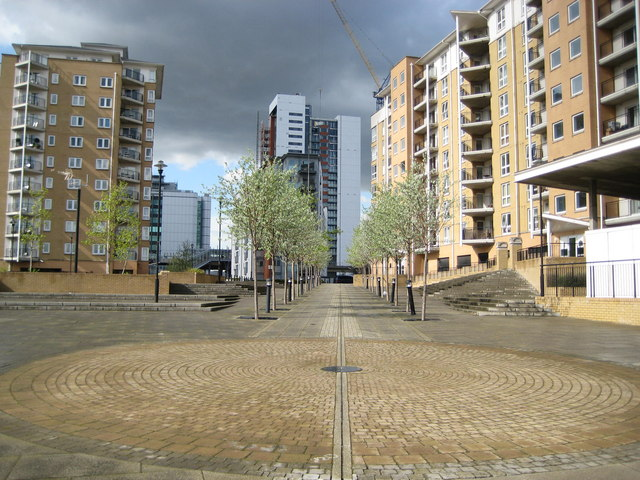
- Virginia Quay, the line that runs down the centre of the avenue marking the prime meridian

- Location within Greater London
- Population: 19,461 (2011 Census. Blackwall and Cubitt Town Ward)
- OS grid reference: TQ385805
- London borough: Tower Hamlets
- Ceremonial county: Greater London
- Region: London
- Country: England
- Sovereign state: United Kingdom
- Post town: LONDON
- Postcode district: E14
- Dialling code: 020
- Police: Metropolitan
- Fire: London
- Ambulance: London
- UK Parliament: Poplar and Limehouse
- London Assembly: City and East

Blackwall is an area of Poplar, in the London Borough of Tower Hamlets, East London. The neighbourhood includes Leamouth and the Coldharbour conservation area.

The area takes its name from a historic stretch of riverside wall built along an outside curve of the Thames, to protect the area from flooding. Along with the rest of Poplar, Blackwall has its origin in the Manor and Ancient Parish of Stepney. While mostly residential, the Poplar Dock and Blackwall Basin provide moorings for vessels.

== Setting and administration ==
The area's significance derived from its position on an outside curve of the Thames, where currents slowed down, making it a sheltered spot useful to a range of shipping activities. This sheltered position was enhanced by the presence of the Blackwall Rock reef, though this could also be a danger to shipping. A further advantage of the area was that it lay east of the Isle of Dogs, so loading and unloading here avoided that time and effort of sailing round that peninsula to London, while still being very close to the City of London.

The area developed on the riverside, next to Poplar's East Marsh and was known as Blackwall by at least the 14th century; taking its name from the colour of the river wall, built - with its stairs - in the Middle Ages. Having never been an administrative unit, the area lacks formal definition, but can be broadly described as the part of Poplar close to the Thames on the north-east part of the Isle of Dogs peninsula extending eastward to the confluence of the Thames and Lea.

Blackwall gives its name to Blackwall Reach, the stretch of the Thames east of the Isle of Dogs. Blackwall Reach gives its name to Blackwall Point, the northern tip of the Greenwich Peninsula, south of the Thames in Greenwich (and not in Blackwall).

Blackwall was historically part of the Hamlet of Poplar, an autonomous area of the Manor and Ancient Parish of Stepney in Middlesex. The Hamlet of Poplar became an independent parish in 1817. The civil parish of Poplar had a vestry committee which organised services such as poor relief and road maintenance. Indeed, the whole Isle of Dogs was until the late 20th century referred to as being in Poplar. In 1965, the Metropolitan Borough of Poplar merged with its neighbours to form the new London Borough of Tower Hamlets.

== History ==
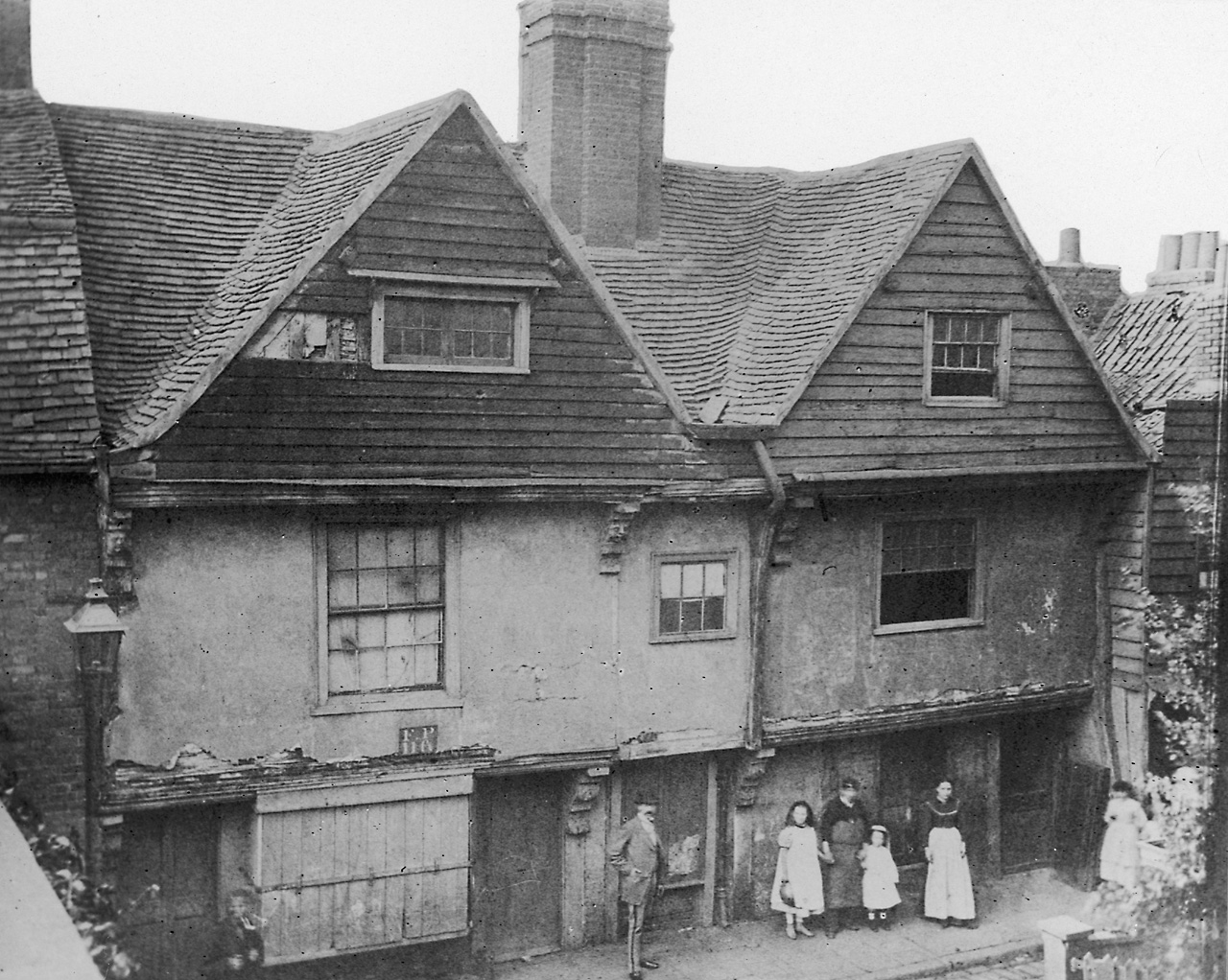
This house at Blackwall, once owned by Sir Walter Raleigh, was demolished during construction of the Blackwall Tunnel.

Blackwall Yard became a major sea hub, and the district was a significant part of the Port of London, and involved with important voyages for over 400 years. Shipfitting and repair was taking place by 1485 and shipbuilding would take place in the area later too. In 1576, Martin Frobisher left Blackwall and landed at Frobisher Bay on Baffin Island, claiming it for England (its first overseas possession) in the name of Queen Elizabeth I. Frobisher was funded by the Muscovy Company seeking the North West Passage. In the early years of the 17th century the port was the main departure point of the English colonisation of North America and the West Indies launched by the London Company. On 20 December 1606, three ships, Susan Constant, Godspeed and Discovery, sailed from Blackwall, landing in Virginia on 26 April 1607 to establish the first permanent English settlement, Jamestown.

The East India Docks and the West India Docks were constructed at the beginning of the 19th century.

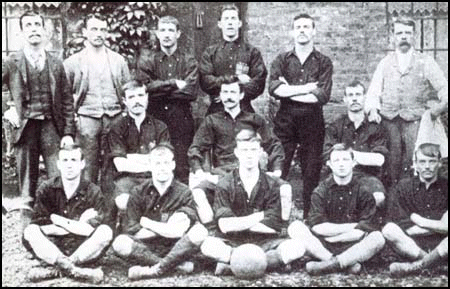
The earliest Thames Ironworks F.C. photo, taken in 1895. The club would be reformed as West Ham United.

Leamouth Wharf was the site of the Samuda Brothers, Orchard House Yard and Thames Iron Works shipyards which were major centres of employment. In 1895, Arnold Hills the owner of the Thames Iron Works and foreman Dave Taylor set up a works team, Thames Ironworks F.C. The club would later be reformed as West Ham United F.C.

Until 1987, Blackwall was a centre of shipbuilding and repair. This activity principally included Blackwall Yard, the Orchard House Yard and the Thames Ironworks and Shipbuilding Company which included land in both Blankwall and Canning Town, which is east of the Lea in the old parish and borough of West Ham. The Blackwall Yard (two of whose former dry docks can still be seen around the present-day Reuters building) built the first Blackwall Frigates.

The London and Blackwall Railway was one of the earliest railway systems in London, operating from 1840. it was also one of the smallest, running from Fenchurch Street Station in the city to Blackwall, a journey of less than twenty minutes, but which was very important to connect to Gravesend passenger boats. Near the Blackwall railway station was built the Brunswick Hotel, located on the Greenwich Meridian line. In its early years, it apparently attracted a fairly elegant crowd, including William IV on an occasion connected with the opening or expansion of the burgeoning docks in the area. Its prime customer base was emigrants (mostly to Australia) who would wait here until they could board small steamers to take them to the large sea-going liners at Gravesend. In the days of sail, these passengers might have to wait for days or weeks until the winds were favourable; but by the end of the century the substitution of steam power and rail links on the south bank of the Thames greatly reduced the viability of the hotel. No evidence remains of either the hotel (demolished in the 1920s) or the railway station (demolished 1946); they stood between Jamestown Way and the Thames.

The Blackwall Tunnel, opened in 1892–1897, carries road traffic under the Thames from Blackwall to the Greenwich Peninsula.

The Brunswick Wharf Power Station was built by Poplar Borough Council for the British Electricity Authority (BEA) in 1952, on the site of the former East India Export Dock. The power station was controversial due to potential air pollution in a densely populated part of London.

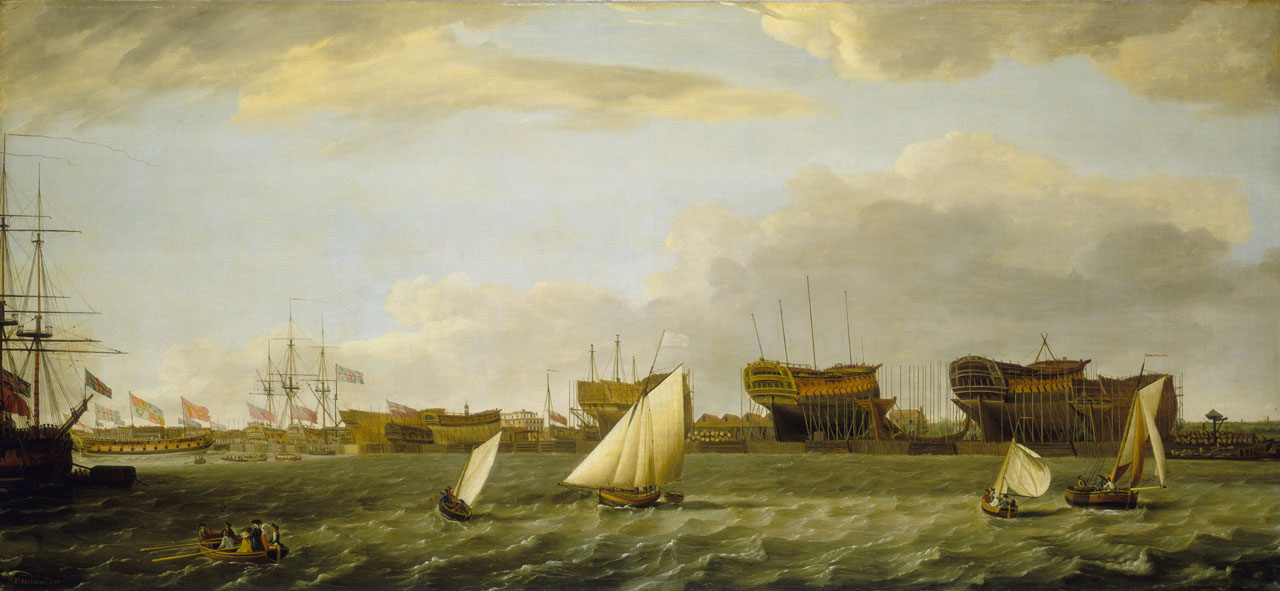
Blackwall Yard from the Thames, by Francis Holman

== Built environment ==
=== Coldharbour Conservation Area ===
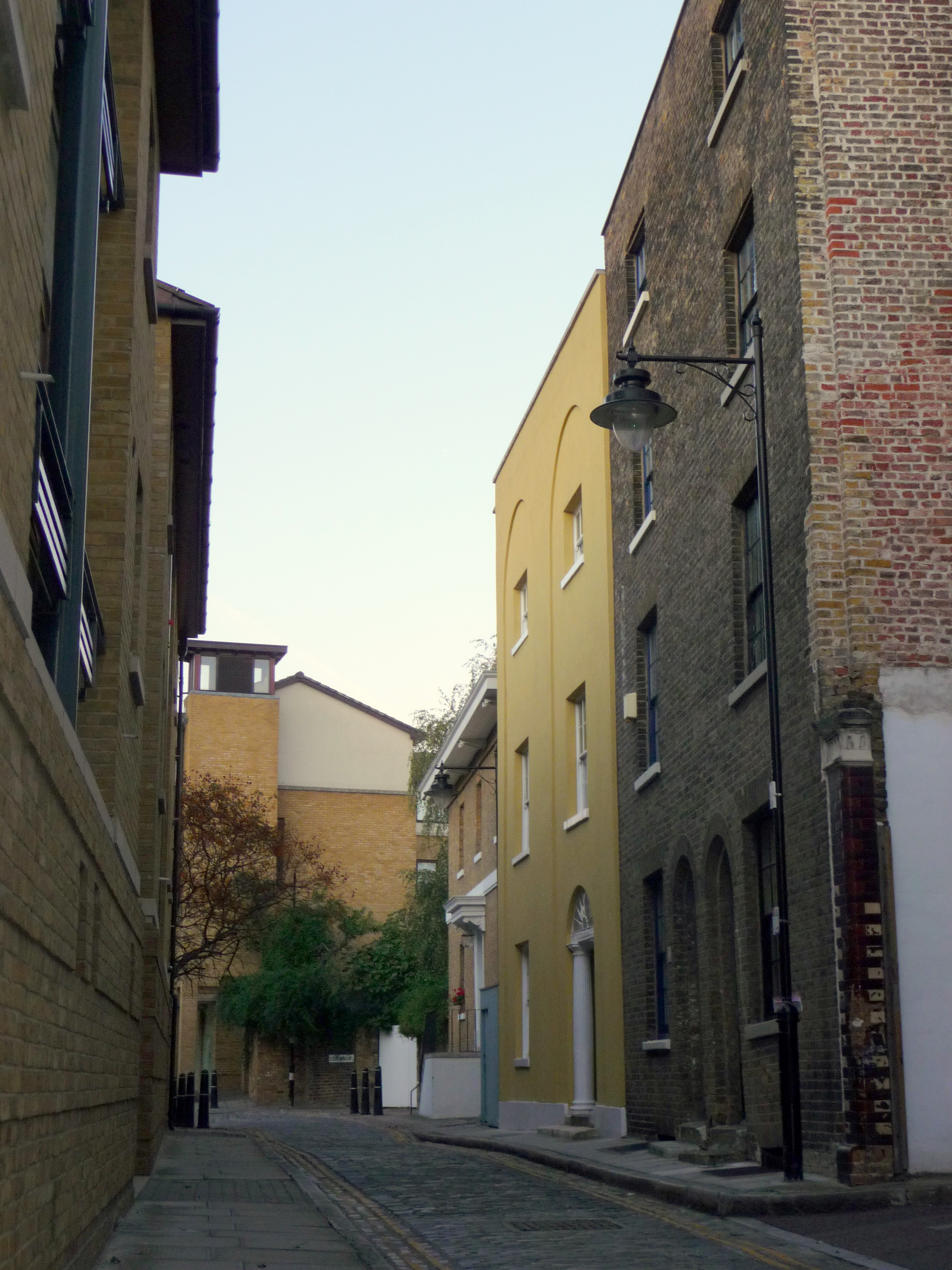
Coldharbour, looking north. The column of glazed bricks on the right marks the site of the Fishing Smack pub, linked to Charles Dickens.

Coldharbour is said to be "the sole remaining fragment of the old hamlet of Blackwall" and "one of the last examples of the narrow streets which once characterised the river's perimeter". It is today largely residential and no longer has any industrial and maritime activities. The Coldharbour Conservation Area, designated in 1975 and then expanded in 2008, has several listed historic buildings as well as engineering structures once part of the former docks.

=== Economic activity ===
Northumberland Wharf is still retained as a working wharf, this has special status by the Mayor of London and the Port of London Authority (PLA) as a safeguarded wharf. It is run by Cory Riverside Energy who also managed the Reuse and Recycling Centre which is next to the wharf and for the transportation of waste by barge along the River Thames.

=== Housing developments ===
The 1980s, Blackwall saw the area first redevelopment project, a luxury housing complex called Jamestown Harbour over the Blackwall Basin, designed by WCEC Architects for the Wates Group and was completed by 1985. Jamestown Harbour was one of the first housing developments of the London Docklands. With its brick-built warehouse-style exteriors and distinctive blue and red balconies, it was designed to recreate the appearance of traditional river and dockside warehouses.

In the 2000s, a residential development New Providence Wharf began to be built, which was designed and built by Skidmore, Owings & Merrill and Ballymore Group and saw the Ontario Tower and Providence Tower (now the Charrington Tower) completed in 2007 and 2016 respectively.

== Transport ==
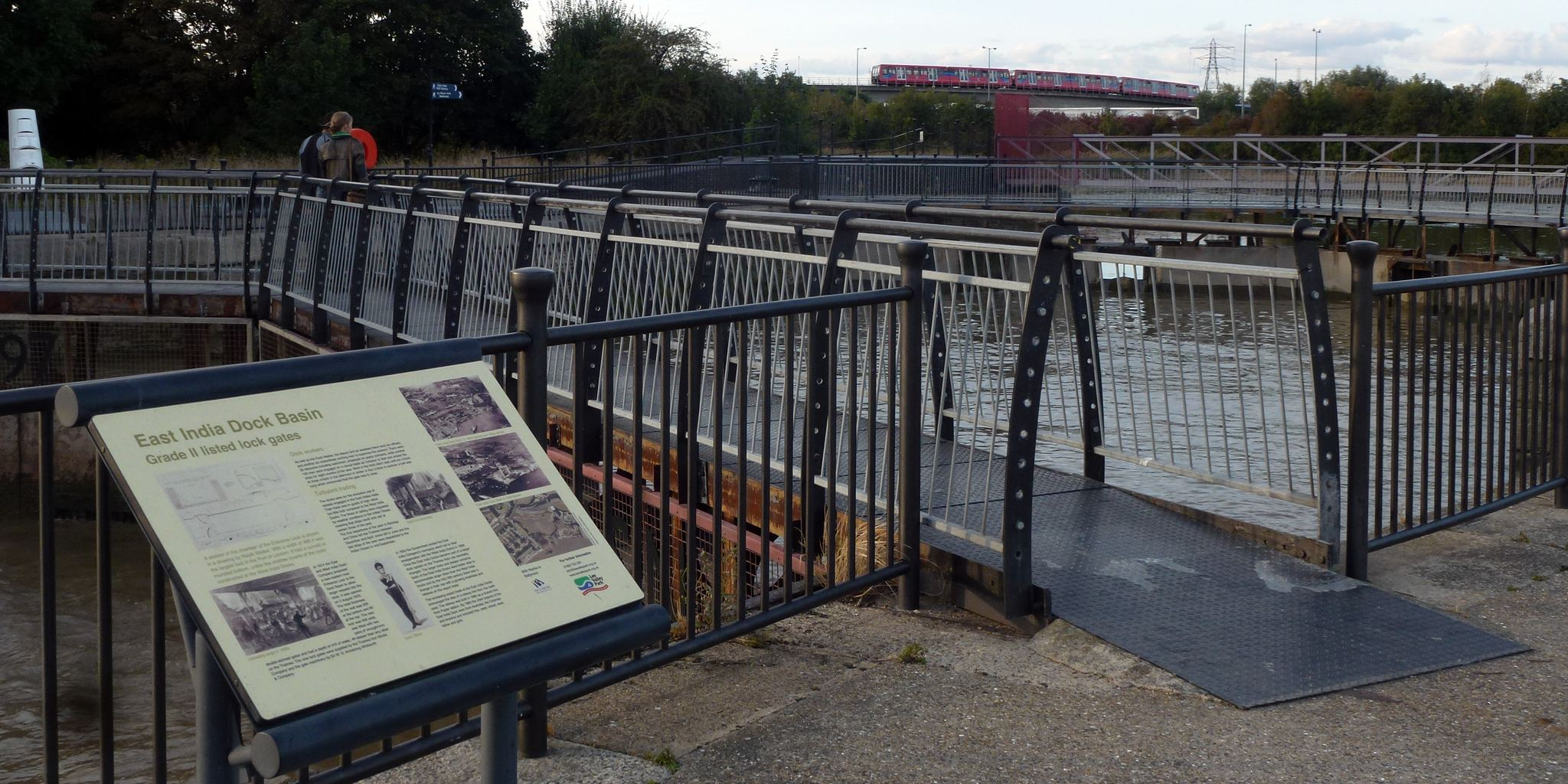
East India Dock Basin with a passing Docklands Light Railway train in the background in September 2012.

Historic

The former London and Blackwall Railway ran from Minories to Blackwall by way of Stepney, a distance of three and half miles. This was authorised in 1836 as "The Commercial Railway", running close to Commercial Road in the East End of London to the Blackwall railway station.

Contemporary

The areas major roads; the A1261 (Aspen Way) and the A102 Blackwall Tunnel Approach Road bring a significant degree of air pollution and community severance.

London Buses routes D3 on west-east Blackwall Way, and D6, D7 and N550 on north-south Preston Road give local access to neighbouring Poplar, Leamouth, the Isle of Dogs and Canary Wharf.

The Thames Path (north bank) National Trail which opened in 1996 is connected to Blackwall, it enters the district at the South Dock Entrance and goes via Coldharbour and Blackwall Way and rejoins the River Thames at Virginia Wharf till the East India Docks at Blackwall Point.
