= Piccadilly Tower =

Proposed tower in Manchester, England

- Interactive map of the Piccadilly Tower area

General information
- Status: Proposed
- Type: Residential, hotel and car parking
- Location: Manchester, England
- Coordinates: 53°28′42.96″N 2°13′50.88″W
- Construction started: 2008 (on hold since mid-2008 and still on hold)
- Estimated completion: Unknown
- Opening: Unknown
- Cost: £220 million

Height
- Roof: 188 m (617 ft)

Technical details
- Floor count: 58

Design and construction
- Architect: Woods Bagot
- Developer: Ballymore Group

The Piccadilly Tower (Eastgate or Inacity Tower) is a proposed development designed by Woods Bagot in Manchester city centre, England.

== History ==
The developer proposed to build a 58-storey, 188-metre (617 ft) skyscraper.

The tower would have 420 residential units and a 220-bed hotel, as well as a fitness centre, conference facilities, restaurants and bars. New public walkways would be constructed along the Ashton Canal adjacent to the site. Three underground floors would provide car parking for residents through an NCP public car park. A 17-storey "East build" section would comprise retail/commercial/residential space.

The site, a car park on a railway viaduct to the rear of Piccadilly station between Store Street and Ducie Street was purchased by Inacity for £14 million in 2003. The planning application was submitted in 2004 and was approved in March 2005. The cost of the development is around £220 million.

The project was a joint venture between Inacity and Merepark, but has been sold to Irish property developers Ballymore Group, with Inacity retaining a small share. It would be Ballymore's first development in Manchester.

Groundwork started in January 2008, to be completed in August 2008. The work consisted of demolishing eight viaduct arches, redirecting a sewer, and constructing a 19 m (62 ft) deep concrete retaining wall to the north, where the site is adjacent to a canal.

On 8 September 2008, Inacity announced the project was on hold due to the 2008 financial crisis, and construction would not resume until the economy stabilised. The site was converted back to a carpark.

As of 2018, the site was still owned by original developers Ballymore. The site is currently used as a car park as of 2023. Ballymore has objected to numerous developments nearby, such as the renovation of Gateway House, which would block access to Piccadilly station, suggesting the scheme is still alive – at least as a proposal.

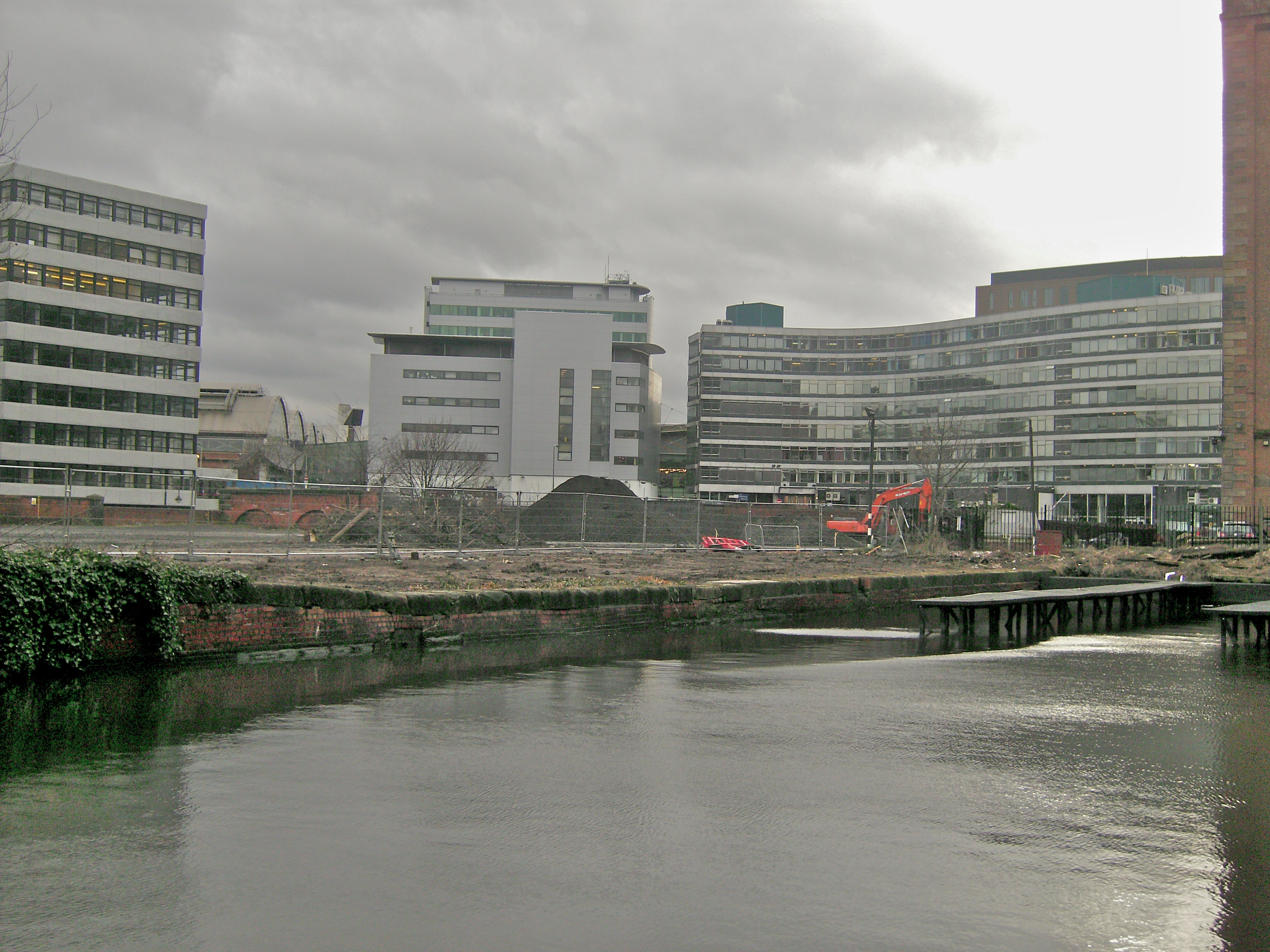
The site for Piccadilly Tower in February 2008 (facing south)

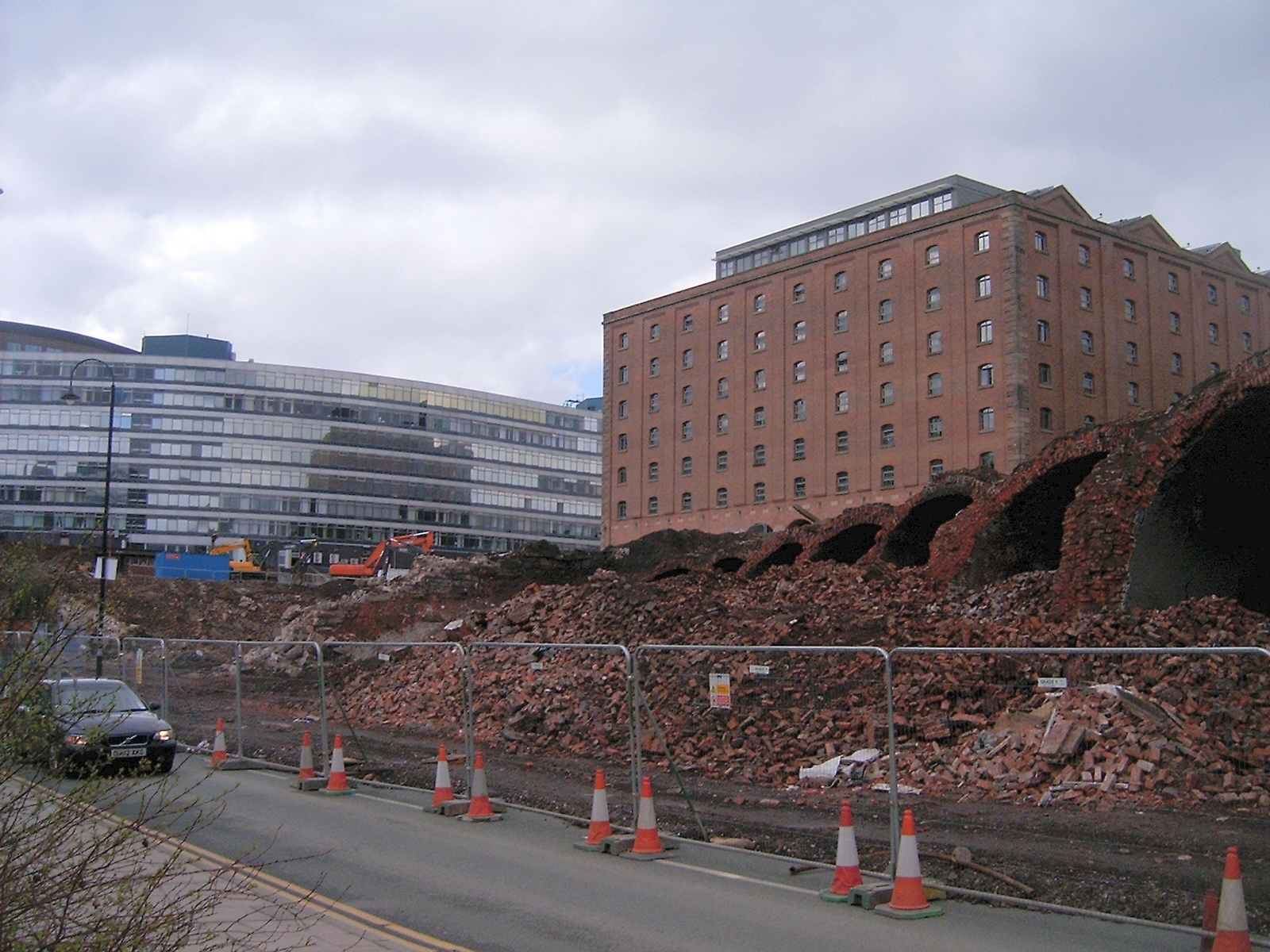
The site of Piccadilly Tower in April 2008

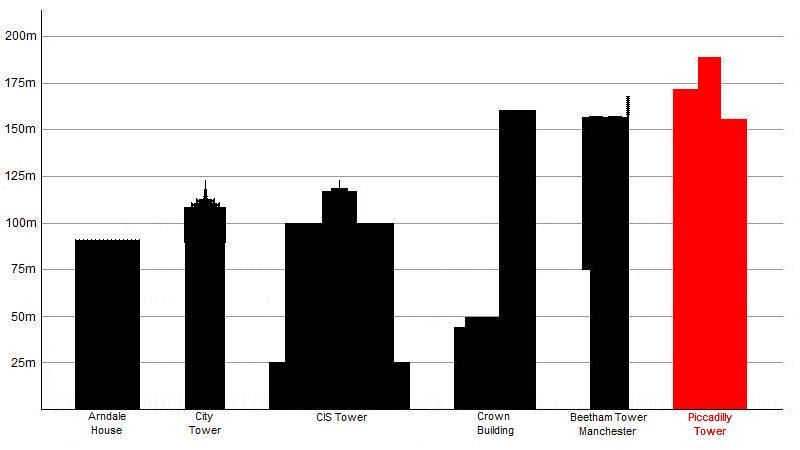
Proposed height of the completed Piccadilly Tower, compared to the height of other existing and approved tall buildings in Manchester.
