= Eden Dock =

Dock in Canary Wharf

Coordinates: 51.5037°N 0.0200°W

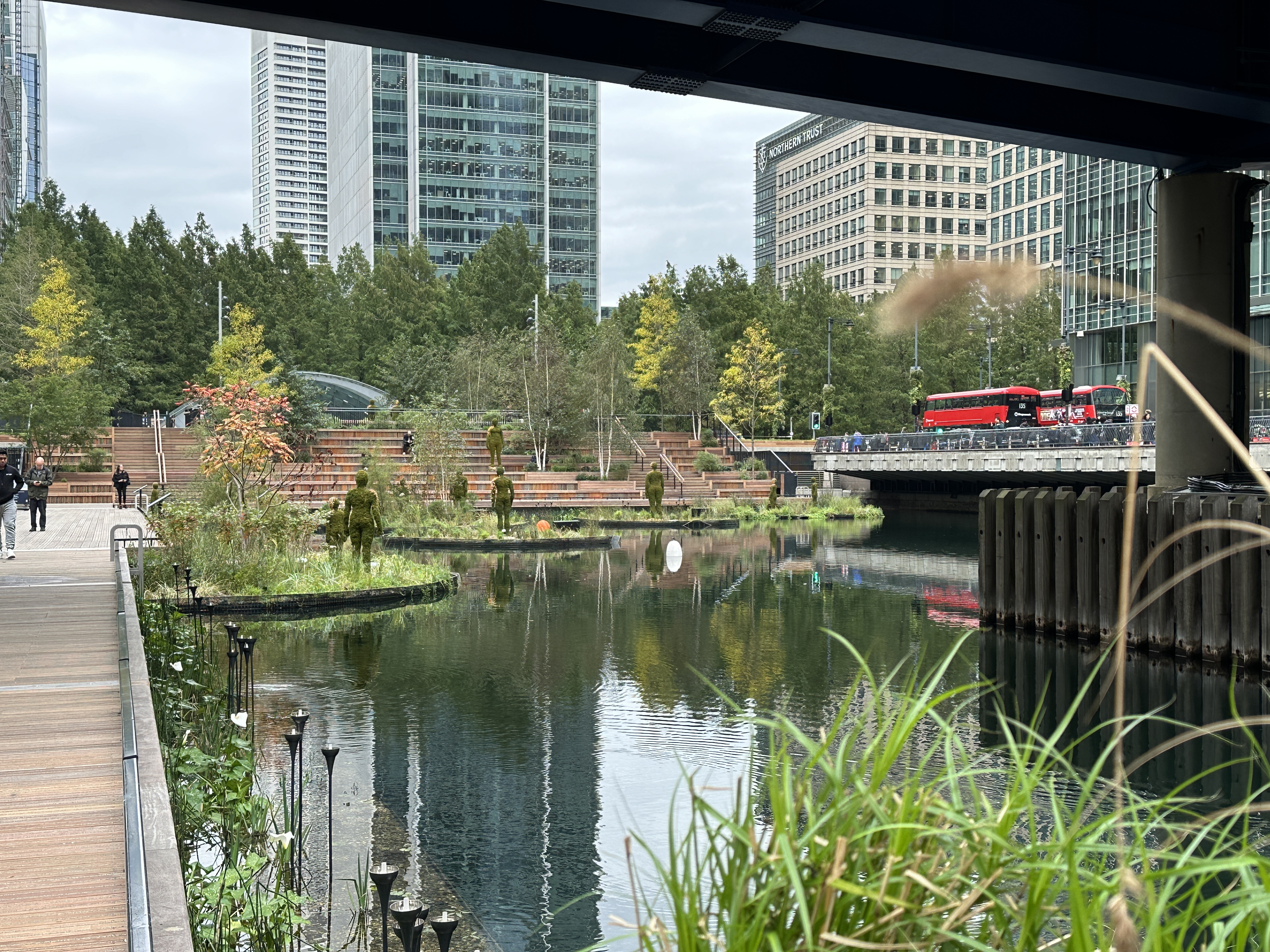
Eden Dock with mossy sculptures

Eden Dock is an area and open space within the Canary Wharf development in London. It is aimed at providing greenery for local residents and promoting biodiversity and water quality in an urban environment.

The dock is named for the Eden Project which promotes biodiversity in its many "biomes" and had a hand in Eden Dock's installation. The area was launched as Eden Dock in October 2024 with a design by Glenn Howells. It is located within Canary Wharf's Middle Dock which had previously been opened to swimming in 2022. In 2025, an application was made to use the water for an Olympic-sized lido to continue its use for open air swimming.
