= Pan Peninsula =

Residential towers in London

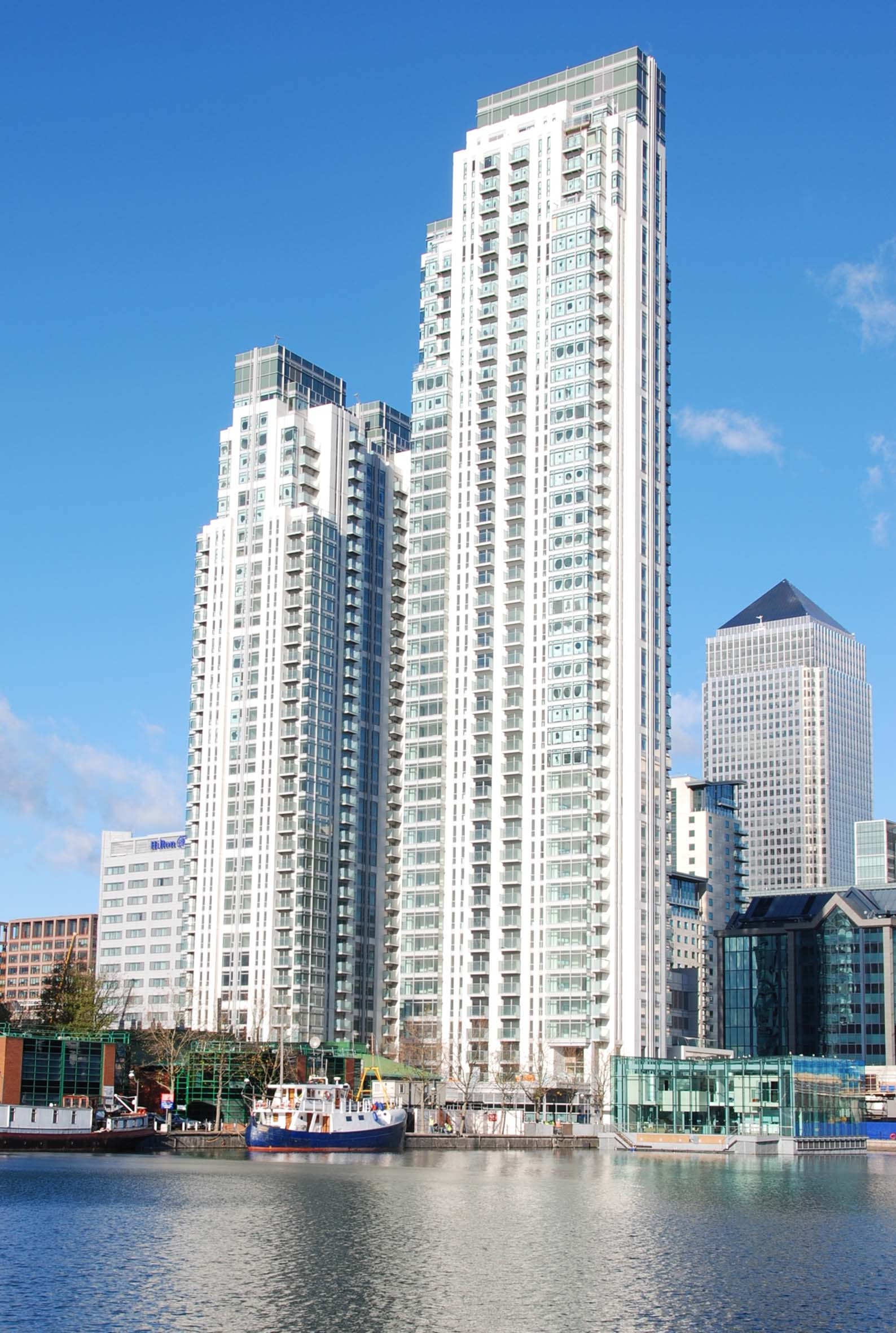
- Interactive map of the Pan Peninsula area

General information
- Location: Isle of Dogs, London, E14; United Kingdom, 70 Marsh Wall, London, E14 9HQ, United Kingdom
- Coordinates: 51.5001°N 0.0179°W
- Construction started: 2005
- Completed: 2008
- Opened: February 2009

Height
- Roof: 148 m (486 ft) (East Tower); 122 m (400 ft) (West Tower)

Technical details
- Floor count: 48 (East Tower); 38 (West Tower)

Design and construction
- Architect: Skidmore, Owings and Merrill
- Developer: Ballymore Group
- Structural engineer: WSP Cantor Seinuk

Pan Peninsula, also known as 1 Millharbour, is a residential development on the Isle of Dogs, London located near South Quay DLR station. Pan Peninsula is one of several high-rise residential developments that have been constructed on the Isle of Dogs. It was arguably the first “Ultra Luxury” development in Canary Wharf.

== Design ==
Pan Peninsula consists of two towers—the taller East tower is 148 m (486 ft) and 48 storeys, surpassing the towers of the Barbican Estate and one of three joint 44th-tallest buildings in London as of March 2023. The shorter West tower is 122 m (400 ft) and 38 storeys tall.

The East tower was topped-out in September 2007. Both buildings were completed in 2008, with the first residents moving in from early 2009.

The project was designed by Skidmore, Owings and Merrill and was developed by Irish property firm Ballymore.

The towers are connected by a reception area containing a concierge foyer, multi-floor gym, private cinema and terraced restaurant. The 48th floor of the East tower houses a cocktail bar which is open to residents and their guests. The tops of the towers have been designed to resemble lanterns, providing strong LED lighting features that are very visible on the skyline and gradually change colour.

== Apartments ==
The West Tower contains 430 units, while the East Tower houses 356 units. The towers house mainly two-bedroom, one-bedroom and studio apartments, all containing balconies. The studio apartments are relatively small, containing storage space in the majority of the finished walls, and a fold-up bed that locks into the wall space, creating a dining room environment. In 2006, the penthouse was sold for £7 million.

== Gallery ==
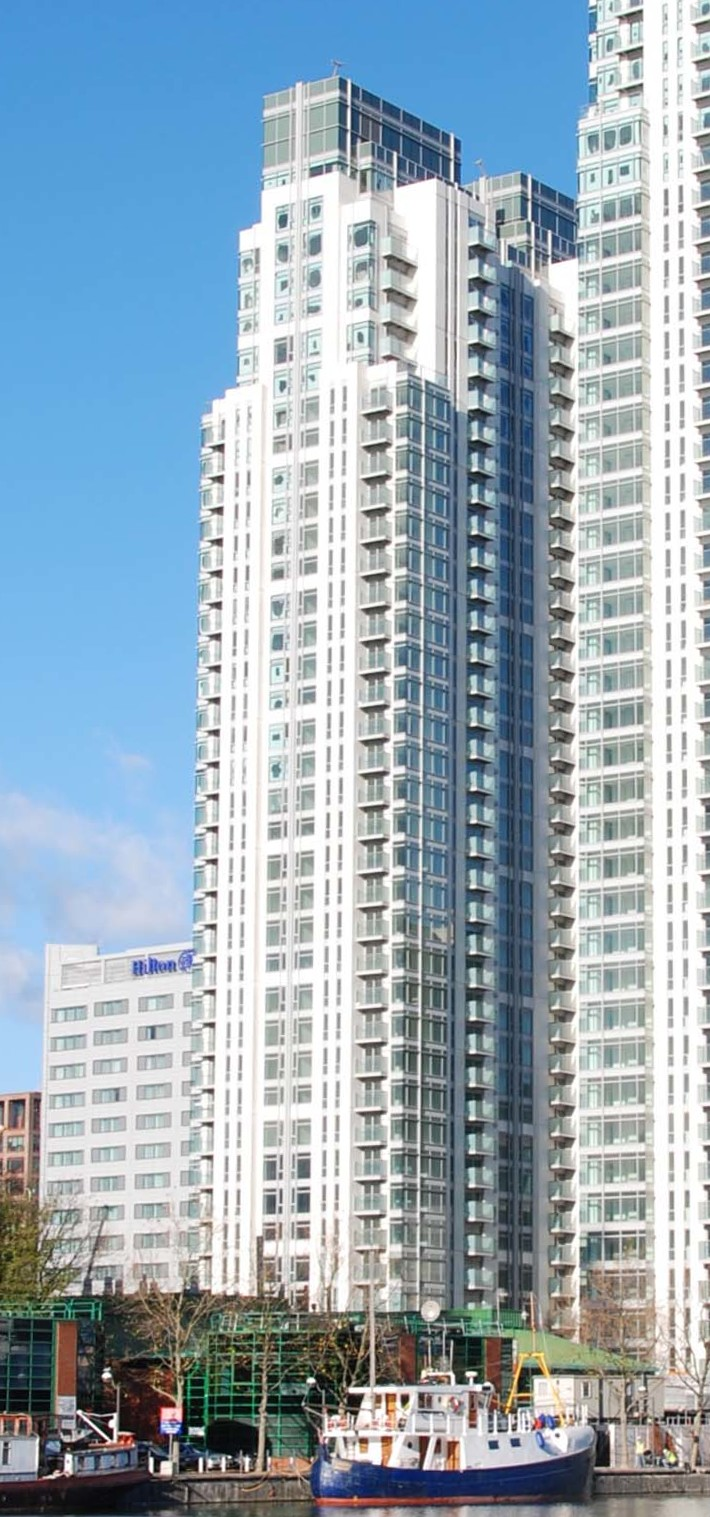
Pan Peninsula London (West Tower).

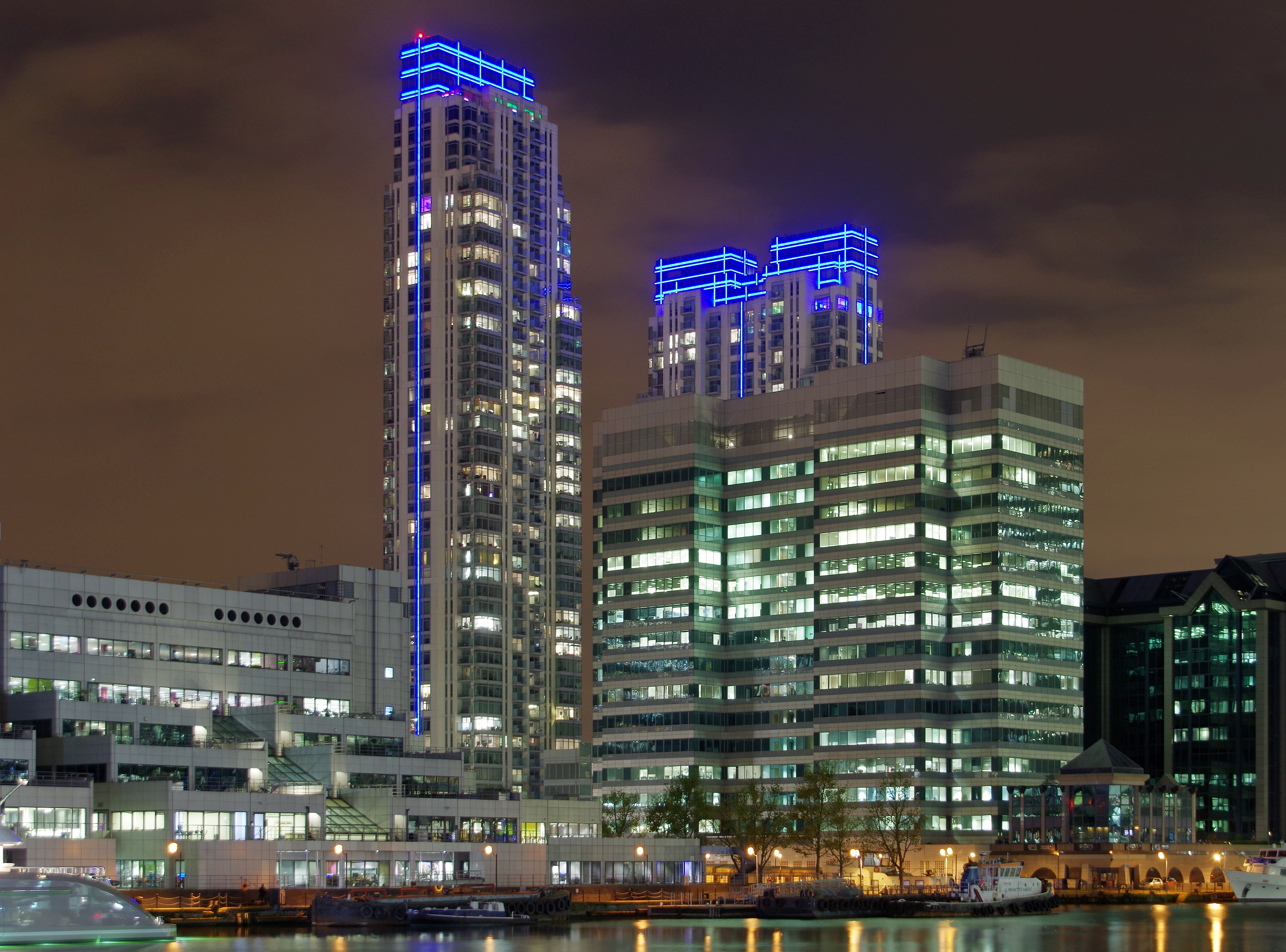
The Pan Peninsula towers at night

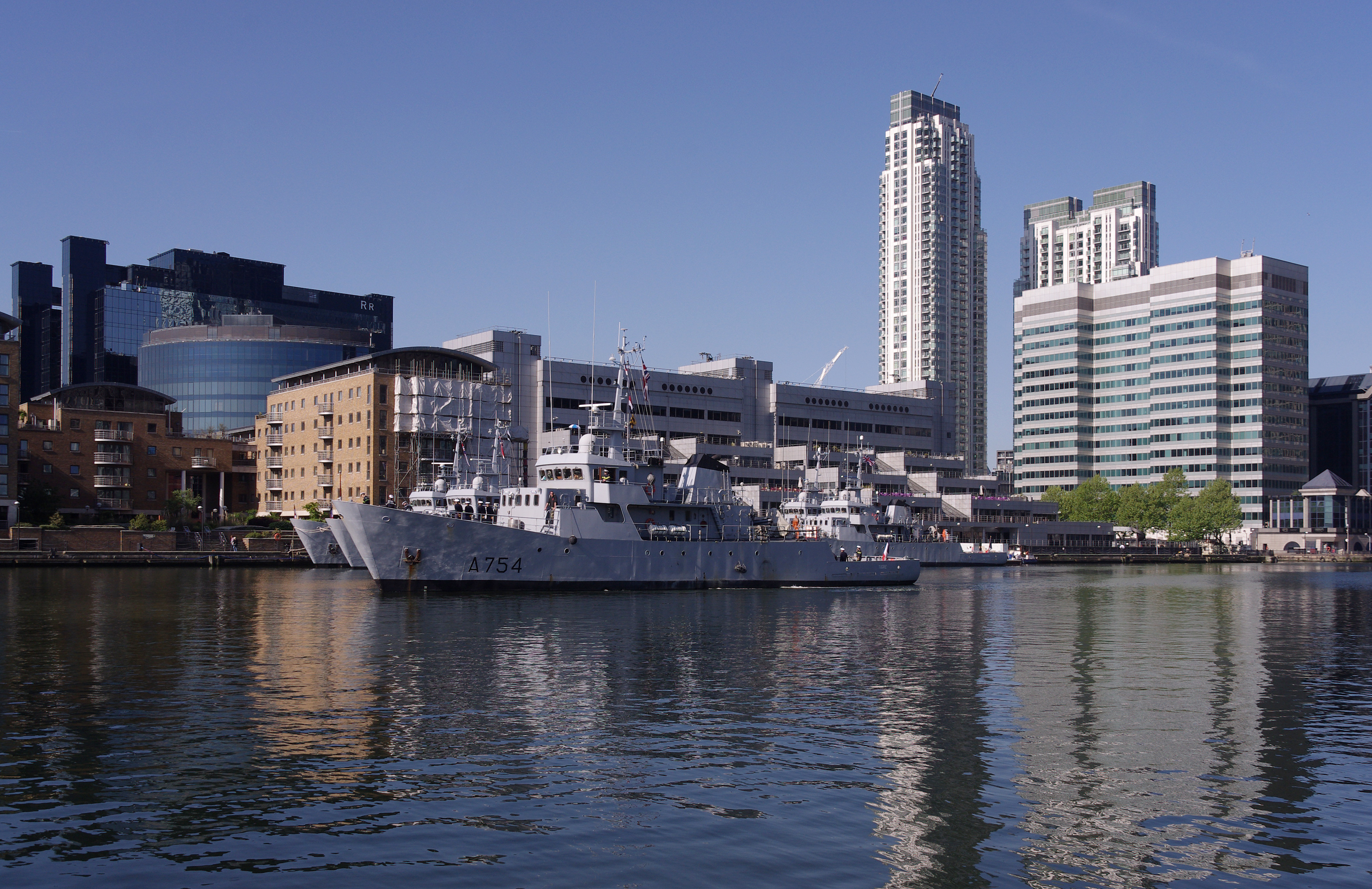
A French navy (Marine Nationale) ship heads towards the City Canal western lock in London's Canary Wharf.

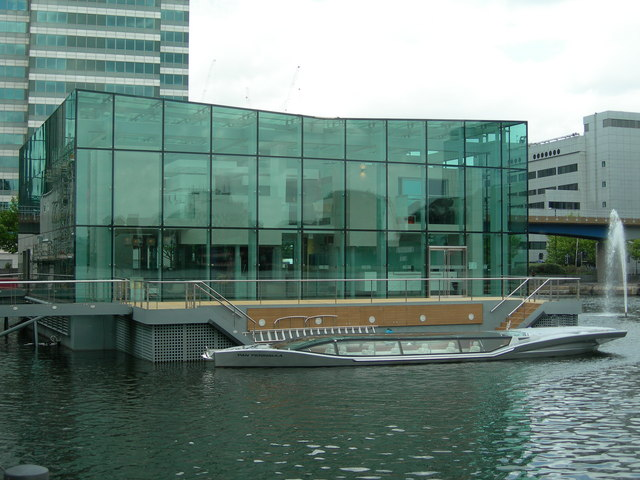
Pan Peninsula Marketing Suite

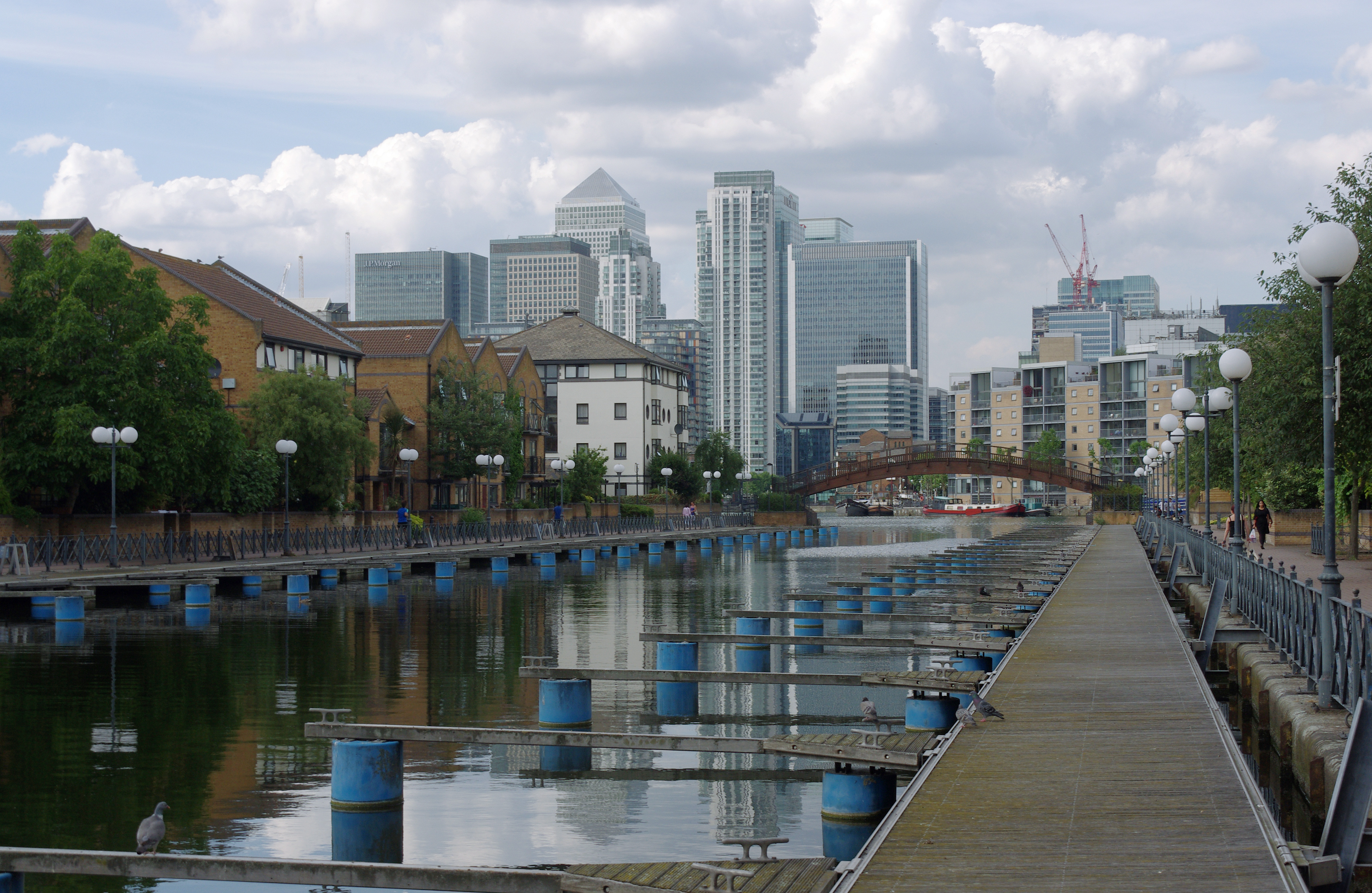
Looking towards Pan Peninsula and Canary Wharf from the south end of Millwall Dock.

== See also ==
- Canary Wharf
- Riverside South (Canary Wharf)
- Tall buildings in London
- Phoenix Heights
