= New Providence Wharf =

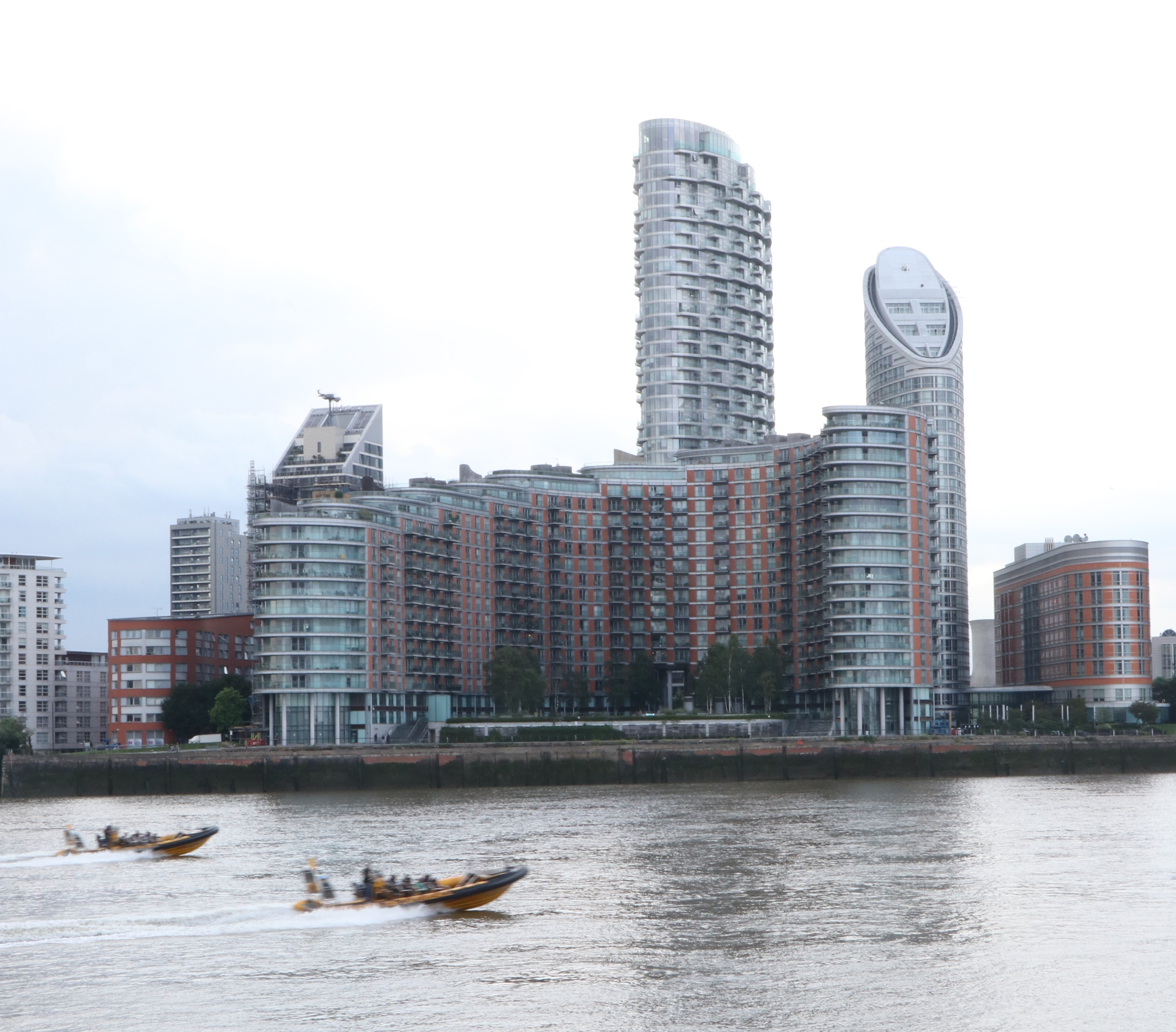
- New Providence Wharf, viewed from North Greenwich (2021)
- Interactive map of the New Providence Wharf area

General information
- Status: Completed
- Type: Residential
- Location: 1 Fairmont Avenue; Tower Hamlets, London
- Coordinates: 51°30′22″N 0°0′17″W

Design and construction
- Architect: Skidmore, Owings and Merrill
- Developer: Ballymore Group

The New Providence Wharf is a residential development in the Blackwall district of the London Borough of Tower Hamlets, at the north end of the Blackwall Tunnel. It was designed by Skidmore, Owings and Merrill and is managed by Ballymore, a property development company.

It consists of a crescent-shaped block along Fairmont Avenue and Yabsley Street (New Providence Block A-E, with 559 apartments), two taller buildings - the Ontario Tower (256 apartments) and Charrington Tower (originally Providence Tower, 360 apartments) - the Michigan Building (72 apartments) and Columbia West (19 apartments).

Early phases of the development were completed in 2005, and were built of materials that complied with the guidance that applied at that time. However, following the 2017 Grenfell Tower fire, it emerged that the 19-floor New Providence Block A-E used the same aluminium composite material (ACM) for cladding. More than 500 households would, on average, have to pay over £4,000 each after freeholder Landor Residential, part of the Ballymore group, refused to cover the cost of recladding the block. In February 2019, Ballymore offered residents a 20% contribution towards recladding costs, but gave them a two-week ultimatum to foot the rest of the £2.4m bill, despite stated MHCLG policy that leaseholders should not to be made to pay to remediate dangerous cladding systems. Ballymore also offered loans, but threatened to cancel its 20% contribution and add a 5% interest to the loan if any resident threatened the company with legal action.

== Fires ==
=== May 2021 fire ===
On 7 May 2021, the ACM-clad building, New Providence Block A-E, at New Providence Wharf suffered a major fire. The blaze affected parts of the 8th, 9th and 10th floors of Block D, and resulted in two people being taken to hospital, plus the evacuation of 42 people. Ballymore said the ACM played no part in the blaze.

A London Fire Brigade report about the fire revealed serious safety failings. It said the fire started in a fuse board in an 8th floor flat, and then spread outside via timber decking. A faulty ventilation system meant the building acted like a "broken chimney" while escape routes filled with smoke. LFB deputy commissioner Richard Mills said "The New Providence Wharf fire needs to be an urgent wake-up call to all building owners and managers. ... It is too late to wait for a fire to see if [fire safety solutions] work."

=== August 2024 fire ===
On 26 August 2024, a fire broke out on the 25th floor of Charrington Tower, destroying half of an apartment and its balcony.
