= Wardian London =

Coordinates: 51.501234°N 0.022895°W

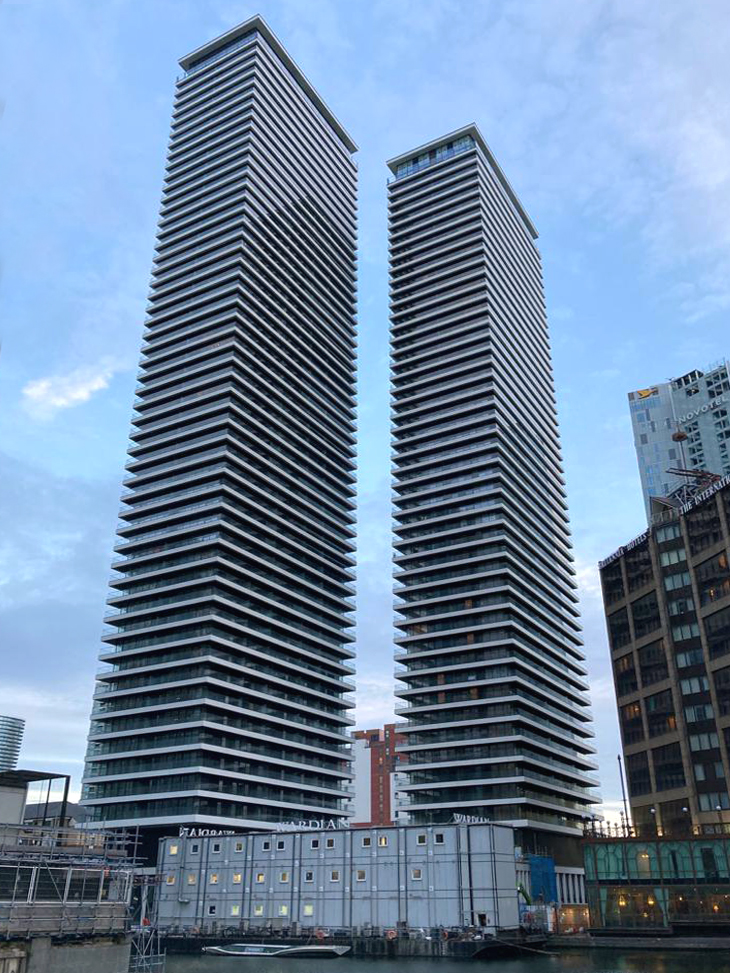
- Wardian London 2020
- Interactive map of the Wardian London area

General information
- Status: Completed
- Type: Residential
- Location: Marsh Wall, London, E14
- Completed: August 2020
- Opening: 2020
- Client: Eco World-Ballymore

Height
- Height: 187.2 m (614 ft)/168.1 m (552 ft)

Technical details
- Floor count: 55/50

Design and construction
- Architecture firm: Glenn Howells Architects

Wardian London is an ultra-luxury residential complex located in the Millwall close to the Canary Wharf estate from Eco World-Ballymore and designed by architect firm Glenn Howells. The scheme consists of two skyscrapers that completed in 2020, is one of the tallest residential developments in London and the United Kingdom.

With over 70% of the flats priced at over £1.5 million, and penthouses priced at over £5 million, Wardian London is considered to be the most expensive residential development in East London. Occupants will also be members of The Wardian Club and have exclusive access to amenities including 24 hours concierge, spa & gym, 25-metre heated swimming pool, cinema, business centre, restaurants, shops and observation deck.

In 2023, Wardian was awarded the Silver Award for Best Luxury Development at the What House? Awards, as a recognition of EcoWorld Ballymore's emphasis on biophilia at the scheme and a celebration of its efforts in introducing nature to a dense built environment.

== Background and design ==
=== Original plans ===
Prior to the current scheme, developer Ballymore had been granted planning permission for a 525,000 sq ft office development on the same site. This proposal consisted of two towers of 26 and 16 storeys. Building work got as far as completing part of the basement before Ballymore abandoned the scheme due to a lack of tenancy agreements.

=== New proposal ===
In 2013, Ballymore applied for new planning permission for two, residential-led towers designed by Glenn Howells Architects in the Isle of Dogs, just south of Canary Wharf. The scheme was granted planning permission on 6 November 2014 by councillors at Tower Hamlets council.

The two towers are 55 and 50 storeys. The East Tower is the larger of the two skyscrapers and rises to 187.2 m (614 ft) in height while the West Tower reaches 168.1 m (552 ft), making them two of the tallest residential buildings approved in London and in the United Kingdom. The skyscrapers are linked at their base by a podium. In total, the development will provide 766 residential apartments.

In 2015, the development name was changed from Arrowhead Quay to Wardian London.

=== Sale ===
In January 2015, Ballymore announced a deal with Malaysian property investment company, Eco World, in which Ballymore sold Wardian London to Eco World as well as two other schemes, namely, Embassy Gardens and phase two of its London City Island development for £428m. This created a holding company known as Eco World-Ballymore Holding Company Limited. Ballymore own 25 per cent of the company and Eco World own the remaining 75 per cent. However, Ballymore will continue to manage the three schemes within the new company.

== Construction ==
Construction for the two towers topped out in August 2019, with the first residents moving in during early 2020. Final construction of the development is due to be complete in early 2021.

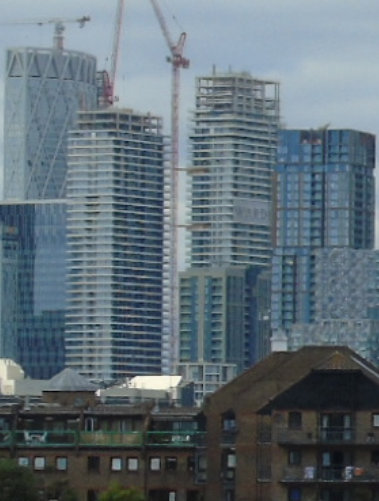
July 2018

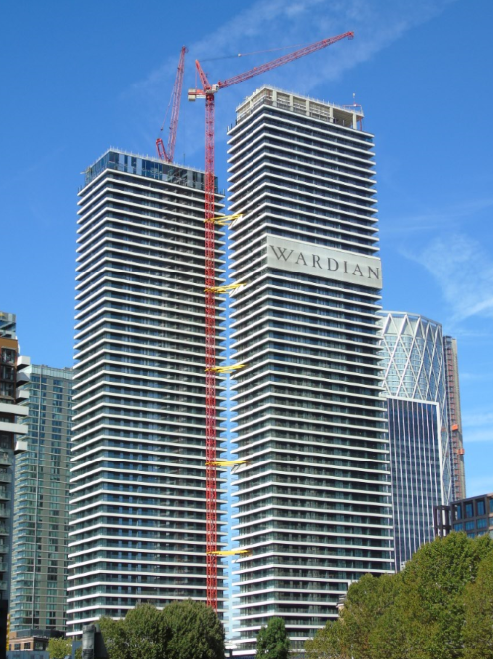
July 2019

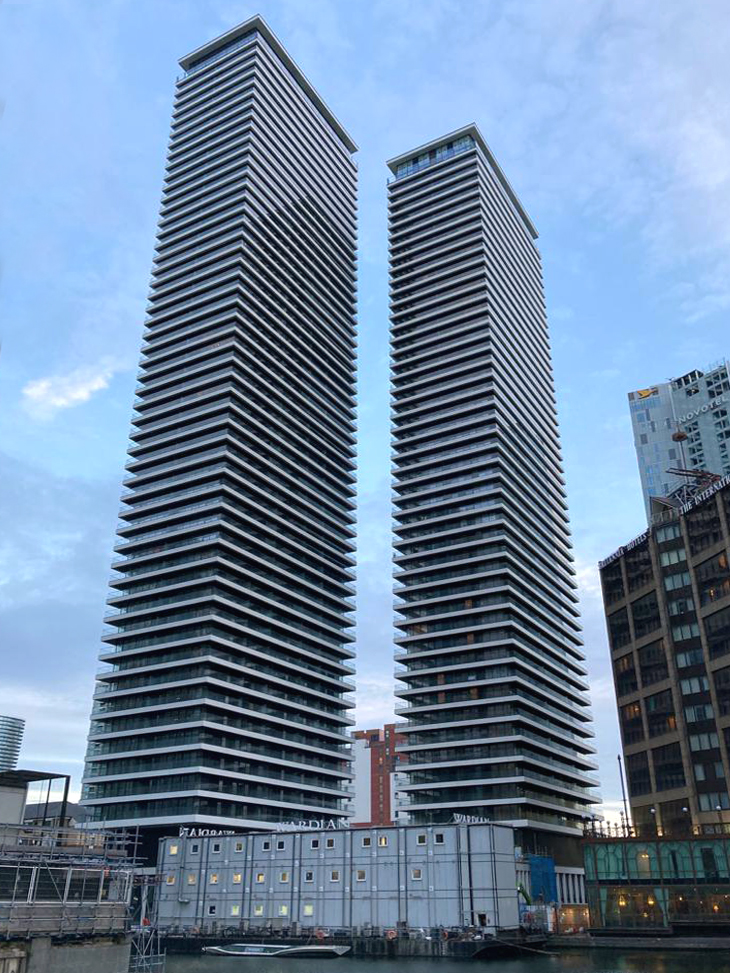
August 2020

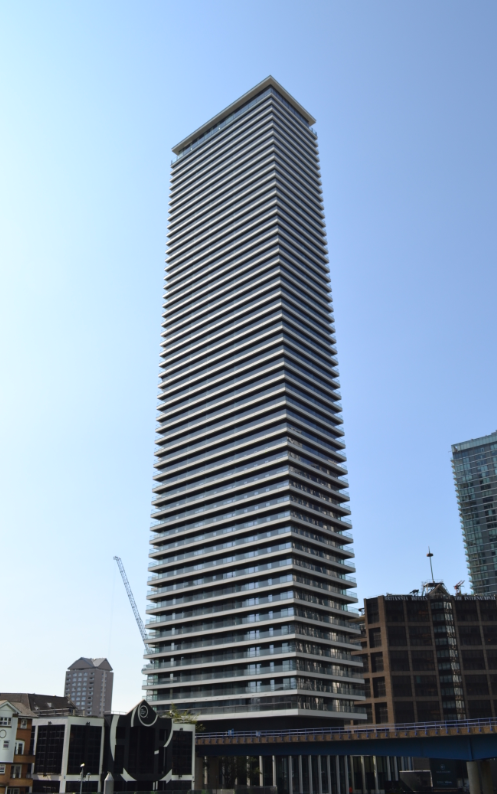
East Tower, September 2020

== Location ==
The skyscrapers are located east of 163 Marsh Wall on the Isle of Dogs, to the immediate south of Canary Wharf's commercial district. The nearest stations are South Quay DLR and Heron Quays DLR. The closest London Underground station is Canary Wharf.

== See also ==
- List of tallest buildings and structures in London
- List of tallest buildings in the United Kingdom
