= Ballymore Group =

Ireland-based property developer

- Type: Private
- Industry: Property development
- Founded: 1982
- Key people: Sean Mulryan (Chairman and CEO)
- Website: ballymoregroup.com

Ballymore Group is an Ireland-based international property development company. The majority of the company's employees and business activities are located in the UK.

== History ==
Ballymore Group was founded in 1982 by Sean Mulryan, who is the chairman and the chief executive (CEO). Ballymore Group's UK managing director is John Mulryan, who is a son of the founder.

In January 2015, Ballymore announced a deal with Malaysian property investment company, Eco World, in which Ballymore sold its Wardian London, Embassy Gardens and phase two of its London City Island development to Eco World for £428m. This created a holding company known as Eco World-Ballymore Holding Company Limited. Ballymore own 25 per cent of the company and Eco World own the remaining 75 per cent. However, Ballymore will continue to manage the three schemes within the new company.

In 2016, Ballymore's UK profits were recorded at €217m; it was reported in the Irish Independent that these were "exceptional gains" and had resulted in almost a threefold profit increase. In the same year, the firm won Large Developer of the Year at the RESI Awards and also won Property Developer of the Year at the Evening Standard Awards.

In March 2021, the Financial Times investigated service changes at Ballymore developments. Leaseholders at multiple Ballymore developments faced large increases in their bills, with one citing a 58% increase in annual costs between 2015 and 2020; residents were reportedly left feeling trapped in increasingly unaffordable homes. Ballymore told the FT increases were due to inflation in services such as insurance and utilities, but residents said the charges also covered repairs to fix poor workmanship during the developments' construction.

== London developments ==
=== Embassy Gardens ===
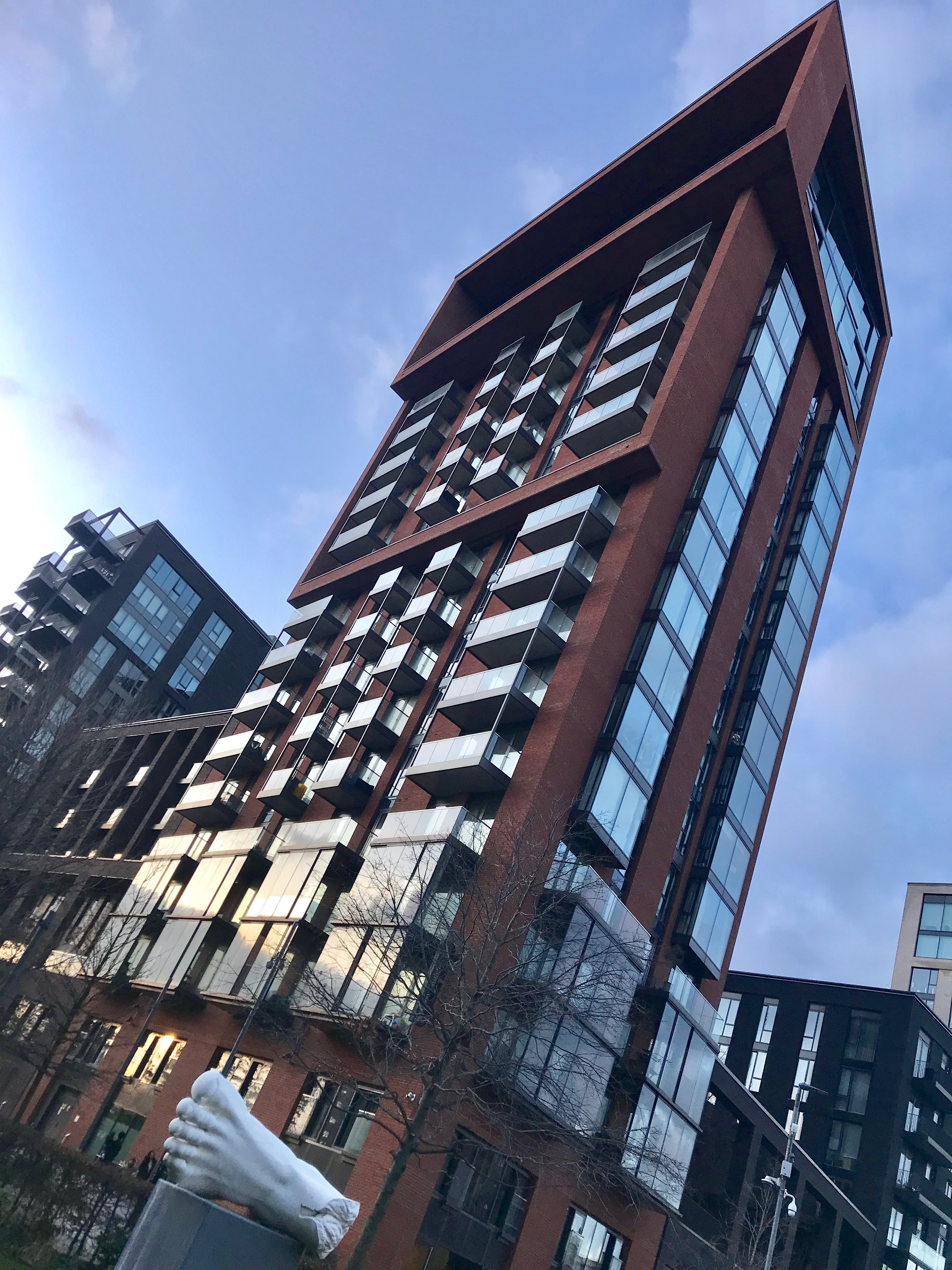
A block of flats in Embassy Gardens

Embassy Gardens in Nine Elms is a 2,000-home complex, positioned alongside the US Embassy (which opened in 2018) and near Battersea Power Station. In 2018, the US Embassy relocated from Grosvenor Square to Embassy Gardens. The land on which the current embassy stands was sold to the US government by the Ballymore Group after a deal was reached in 2008. As well as the US embassy, the Netherlands relocated its embassy to the area, and publisher Penguin Random House moved in 2020 to One Embassy Gardens in 2020, an office building subsequently sold to Kennedy Wilson for £177.5m in June 2021. The development includes a "world first": a sky pool suspended 10-storeys high between two apartment blocks, allowing residents to swim between the buildings. The pool is designed to appear as though it floats in the air and uses 20 cm-thick glass so that swimmers have uninterrupted views of London, including the London Eye and the Palace of Westminster.

In March 2021, Embassy Garden's residents were reported by the Financial Times as being "trapped" in their apartments, with one resident reporting that the service charge had increased by 58 per cent over 5 years to an annual charge of just over £6,500. This is an increase of between 10 - 15% per annum, well above the UK's inflation rate of 2.9% per annum during that period.

=== New Providence Wharf ===
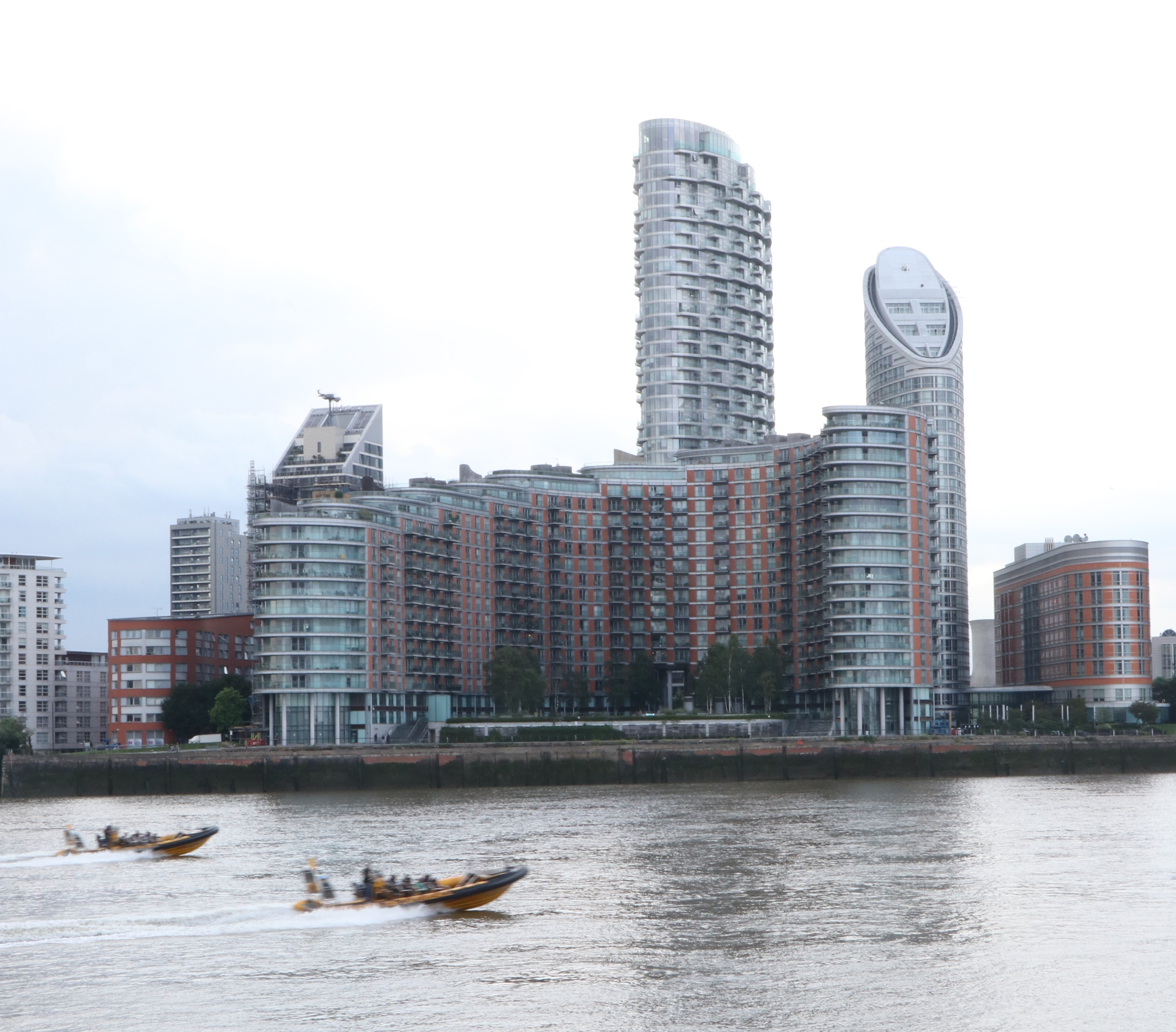
New Providence Wharf housing development, London, viewed from North Greenwich

Ballymore's New Providence Wharf is a 559-apartment scheme, which altered the skyline east of London's Canary Wharf. However, following the 2017 Grenfell Tower fire, it emerged that New Providence Block A-E in Fairmont Avenue used the same aluminium composite material (ACM) cladding. More than 500 households would, on average, have to pay over £4,000 each after freeholder Landor Residential, part of the Ballymore group, refused to cover the cost of recladding the block. In February 2019, Ballymore offered a 20% contribution towards recladding costs, but gave leaseholders a two-week ultimatum to foot the rest of the £2.4m bill, despite stated Ministry of Housing, Communities and Local Government policy that leaseholders should not to be made to pay to remediate dangerous cladding systems. Ballymore also offered loans, but threatened to cancel its 20% contribution and add a 5% interest to the loan if any resident threatened the company with legal action.

On 7 May 2021, the ACM-clad building suffered a major fire. The blaze affected parts of the 8th, 9th and 10th floors, and resulted in two people being taken to hospital, plus the evacuation of 42 people. Ballymore said the ACM played no part in the blaze. A London Fire Brigade report about the fire revealed serious safety failings, including a broken ventilation system which meant the building acted like a "broken chimney" while escape routes filled with smoke.

=== Wardian London ===
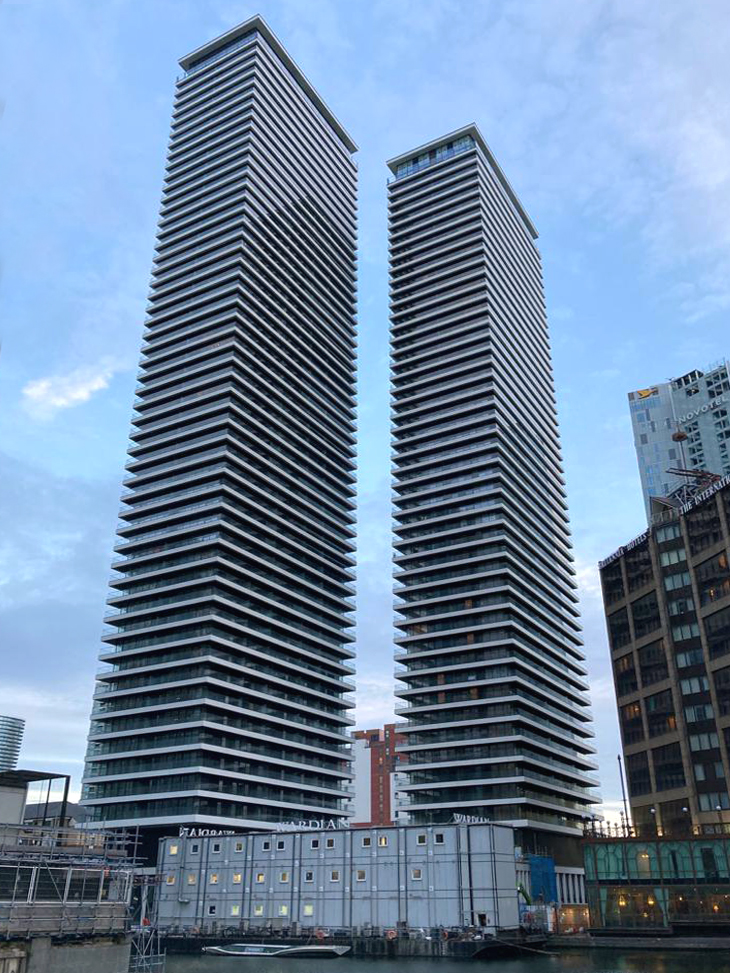
Wardian London, near Canary Wharf

Wardian London, on the Isle of Dogs, consists of two towers, of 55 and 50 storeys, which contain 764 apartments, all with balconies and private gardens. The development features more than 100 different species of exotic plants and its own indoor and outdoor landscaping service.

=== Royal Wharf ===
Ballymore is involved with the regeneration of the Royal Docks, which is seeing £6 billion of private sector investment. West of Thames Barrier Park, it is building Royal Wharf between the river and Silvertown Way, which will have a 550-yard river frontage and include over 3000 homes, two parks and a new school. In April 2017, Investec supported the Silvertown development with a loan of £18m. In January 2019, construction work started on a new riverboat terminal, Royal Wharf Pier. This will allow Thames Clippers to provide a service to the more than 10,000 residents who will live in the 3,385 riverside properties being built by Ballymore in the Royal Docks regeneration area. Royal Wharf has been plagued by problems, with many doors at the development constantly broken, leading to protests from residents.

Ballymore is also developing the adjacent riverfront site to the west, Riverscape, to provide 769 homes.

=== London City Island and Goodluck Hope ===
Ballymore is also responsible for a multi-million pound Canning Town development, City Island, a 12-acre island site that includes 1,000 homes as well as shops and restaurants. Inspired by Manhattan, the development won the top prize at the 2017 London Evening Standard New Homes Awards, and is expected to become a cultural hub, home to the London Film School and the English National Ballet. In 2019, English National Ballet was set to move from its 40-year-old home at Markova House in South Kensington into a new 8,600 sq. m facility, four times the size of its previous home.

South of London City Island, Goodluck Hope is a riverside development located across from the O2 Arena at North Greenwich. Nearby, Ballymore was selected by Places for London to develop the Limmo Peninsula site, south of Canning Town station, delivering 1,400 new homes.

=== Other London developments ===
In May 2017 it was announced that the group was working in partnership with the Hong Kong Chinese Kwok family, who are controlling shareholders in Sun Hung Kai Properties. In October 2018, it was reported that this joint venture would deliver a £1bn skyscraper scheme in the Isle of Dogs in London's docklands. The Millharbour Quarter will comprise 1,513 homes at Millwall Dock. Other Isle of Dogs projects include Baltimore Tower and Pan Peninsula. West of Millharbour, Ballymore's plans for a 51-storey residential tower at Cuba Street were withdrawn for fire safety reasons in January 2022 after London Fire Brigade raised concerns about its reliance on a single staircase for emergency exit.

Further east in the Royal Docks area of Silvertown, Ballymore applied for planning permission in October 2021 to redevelop an industrial area off Thames Road, east of Thames Barrier Park and southwest of London City Airport; 1,610 new homes, ranging from three-storey townhouses to 15-18 storey apartment blocks are planned. Consent for the scheme, revised to 1,685 homes plus a school, commercial workspaces, a park, and retail and community spaces, was given in January 2026, with construction expected to start in 2027.

Ballymore is also planning a 1,700-home development spanning 5.26ha at Knights Road (situated to the west of Lyle Park, Riverscape and Royal Wharf) in west Silvertown, which was approved by Newham Council in April 2026.

== Other UK developments ==
- Snowhill, Birmingham
- Piccadilly Tower, Manchester

== Ireland developments ==
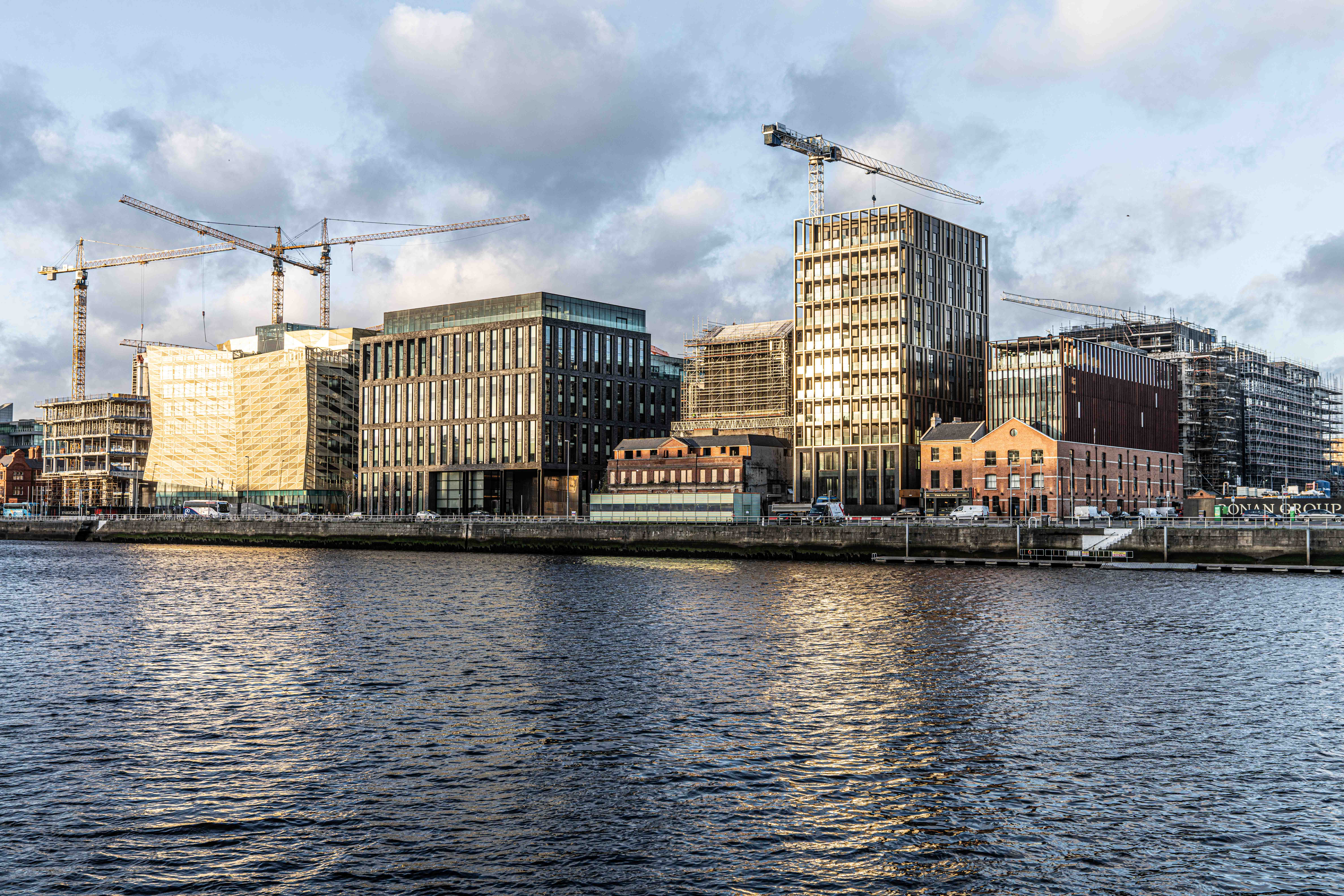
A view of North Wall Quay and Dublin Landings from Sir John Rogerson's Quay

In 2016, Ballymore launched a €700 million development in Dublin's docklands. The Dublin Landings waterfront regeneration project includes 100,000 sq. m (1,076,391 sq. ft) of office, residential and retail/leisure accommodation, of which 22,019 sq. m (237,000 sq. ft) is residential accommodation: 268 residential units with on-site resident amenities including a concierge service, landscaped gardens, a private gym, business lounges and 210 basement parking spaces. In 2019, Ballymore and its commercial partner Oxley Holdings agreed to sell all 268 luxury apartments to Greystar for €175.5m.

There are five Grade A office buildings on the Dublin Landings complex. No 1. The Landings has been let to the NTMA and sold to German institutional investor Triuva. No 2. The Landings has been let to WeWork and sold to the REIT company JR AMC while the Central Bank of Ireland acquired two of the remaining three office buildings - No 4, The Landings, and No 5, The Landings.

Ballymore is also involved in delivering a large mixed-use scheme on 2.8 hectares at Dublin's Connolly station in Dublin's IFSC and a €31.3 million housing development in Naas.
