= William LeMessurier =

American structural engineer (1926–2007)

- Born: June 12, 1926; Pontiac, Michigan, U.S.
- Died: June 14, 2007 (aged 81); Casco, Maine, U.S.
- Education: Harvard College (AB 1947); Harvard Graduate School of Design; Massachusetts Institute of Technology (SM 1953)
- Occupations: Structural engineer, architect, professor
- Known for: Structural engineering

William James LeMessurier Jr. (/ləˈmɛʒər/; June 12, 1926 – June 14, 2007) was an American structural engineer. He worked on the Citicorp Center, Boston City Hall, the Singapore Treasury Building and the Dallas Main Center. He is known for having to reassess his calculations during the Citicorp Center engineering crisis.

== Early life and education ==
Born in Pontiac, Michigan, Will was the youngest of four children of Bertha (Sherman) and William James LeMessurier Sr., owners of a dry cleaning business. After finishing high school, he left Michigan to major in Mathematics at Harvard College. He graduated with a BA in Mathematics in 1947, then went to Harvard Graduate School of Design. He later transferred to the Massachusetts Institute of Technology where he earned his Master's Degree in building engineering and construction in 1953.

== Career ==
While at MIT, LeMessurier worked for Albert Goldberg, an established Boston structural engineer; eventually LeMessurier became a partner and the firm was renamed Goldberg-LeMessurier Associates. In April 1961, the two separated and Will launched his firm LeMessurier Consultants.

LeMessurier was responsible for the structural engineering on a large number of prominent buildings, including Boston City Hall, the Federal Reserve Bank of Boston, the Singapore Treasury Building, and the Dallas Main Center.

LeMessurier is perhaps best known for his role during the Citicorp Center engineering crisis, when he secretly reassessed his calculations on the Citicorp headquarters tower in New York City after the building had been finished in 1977. In June 1978, Princeton University engineering student Diane Hartley contacted LeMessurier's office after she identified that winds could topple the building under certain circumstances. Later, another young student, Lee deCarolis, prompted LeMessurier to redo his analysis. He discovered that the contractor had replaced the required welded joints with lower-cost, and potentially weaker bolted joints. This weakness could contribute to the building collapsing in "... quartering" winds. This realization triggered a hurried, clandestine retrofit, which was described in a 1995 article in The New Yorker titled "The Fifty-Nine-Story Crisis". The case is now an ethical case-study in architectural degree programs.

== Awards ==
He was awarded the AIA Allied Professions Medal in 1968, elected to the National Academy of Engineering in 1978, elected an honorary member of the American Institute of Architects in 1988, and elected an honorary member of the American Society of Civil Engineers (ASCE) in 1989. In 1999, he received the American Institute of Steel Construction's J. Lloyd Kimbrough Award, its highest honor. In 2004, he was elevated to National Honor Member of Chi Epsilon, the national civil engineering honor society.

== Death ==
LeMessurier died in Casco, Maine, on June 14, 2007, as a result of complications after surgery he underwent on June 1 after a fall the day before.

== See also ==
- LeMessurier Consultants
