= Citigroup Center =

Office skyscraper in Manhattan, New York

Citigroup Center 601 Lexington Avenue
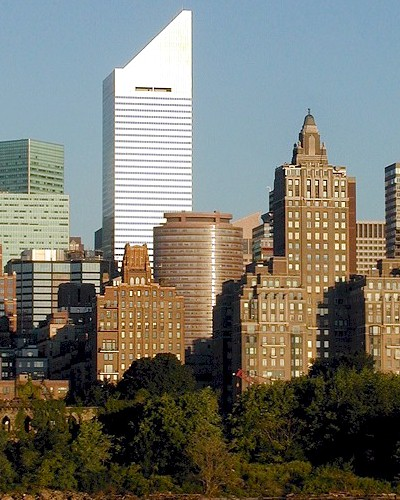
- Former names: Citicorp Center

General information
- Type: Office
- Location: 153 East 53rd Street, New York, NY 10022, U.S.
- Coordinates: 40°45′31″N 73°58′13″W
- Construction started: April 1974
- Topped-out: October 6, 1976
- Completed: 1977
- Opening: October 12, 1977; 49 years ago
- Cost: US$195 million (equivalent to $786 million in 2024)
- Owner: Boston Properties

Height
- Architectural: 915 ft (279 m)

Technical details
- Floor count: 59
- Floor area: 1,654,020 ft^{2} (153,663 m^{2})
- Lifts/elevators: 38

Design and construction
- Architects: Hugh Stubbins and Emery Roth & Sons
- Developer: Citicorp
- Structural engineer: William LeMessurier and James Ruderman

Website
- www.bxp.com/properties/601-lexington-avenue

New York City Landmark
- Designated: December 6, 2016
- Reference no.: 2582
- Designated entity: Office tower, annex, and St. Peter's Church (exterior only)

U.S. National Register of Historic Places
- Designated: August 4, 2025
- Reference no.: 100012060
- Designated entity: St. Peter's Church

The Citigroup Center (formerly Citicorp Center and also known by its address, 601 Lexington Avenue) is an office skyscraper in the Midtown Manhattan neighborhood of New York City, New York, U.S. Built in 1977 for Citibank, it is 915 feet (279 m) tall and has 1.3 million square feet (120,000 m^{2}) of office space across 59 floors. The building was designed by architect Hugh Stubbins, associate architect Emery Roth & Sons, and structural engineer William LeMessurier.

The Citigroup Center takes up much of a city block bounded clockwise from the west by Lexington Avenue, 54th Street, Third Avenue, and 53rd Street. Land acquisition took place from 1968 to 1973. One existing occupant, St. Peter's Lutheran Church, sold its plot on the condition that a new church building be constructed at the base of the tower. The design was announced in July 1973, and the structure was completed in October 1977. Less than a year after completion, the structure had to be strengthened when it was discovered that, due to a design flaw, the building was vulnerable to collapse in high winds. The building was acquired by Boston Properties in 2001, and Citicorp Center was renamed 601 Lexington Avenue in the 2000s. The New York City Landmarks Preservation Commission designated the Citigroup Center as a city landmark in 2016. The building's public spaces underwent renovations in 1995 and 2017.

The tower's base includes four giant stilts, which are placed mid-wall rather than at the building's corners. Its roof is sloped at a 45-degree angle. East of the tower is a six-story office annex. The northwest corner of the tower overhangs St. Peter's Church at Lexington Avenue and 54th Street, a granite structure designed by Stubbins. Also at the base is a sunken plaza, a shopping concourse, and entrances to the church and the New York City Subway's Lexington Avenue/51st Street station. The upper stories are supported by stacked load-bearing braces in the form of inverted chevrons. Upon the Citigroup Center's completion, it received mixed reviews, as well as architectural awards.

== Site ==
The Citigroup Center is at 601 Lexington Avenue in the Midtown Manhattan neighborhood of New York City, New York, U.S. It takes up the majority of a city block bounded by Lexington Avenue to the west, 54th Street to the north, Third Avenue to the east, and 53rd Street to the south. The land lot covers 70,572 square feet (6,556.4 m^{2}) with a frontage of 200 feet (61 m) on Lexington Avenue and a west–east length of 325 feet (99 m). The building shares the block with 880 Third Avenue, an 18-story structure at 53rd Street and Third Avenue. Other nearby buildings include 599 Lexington Avenue to the south, 100 East 53rd Street and the Seagram Building to the southwest, 399 Park Avenue to the west, the Central Synagogue to the northwest, and the Lipstick Building to the east. The New York City Subway's Lexington Avenue/51st Street station is directly underneath the building.

Thirty-one parcels were acquired and cleared to make way for the development. The 54th Street frontage was largely occupied by brownstone houses. Some of the other lots contained commercial spaces, ranging from small shops to the upscale Cafe Chauveron. The site also included the Medical Chambers on 54th Street, which was owned by a cooperative of doctors. St. Peter's Evangelical Lutheran Church occupied the corner of Lexington Avenue and 54th Street; its sanctuary was rebuilt when the Citigroup Center was developed.

=== Street furniture ===
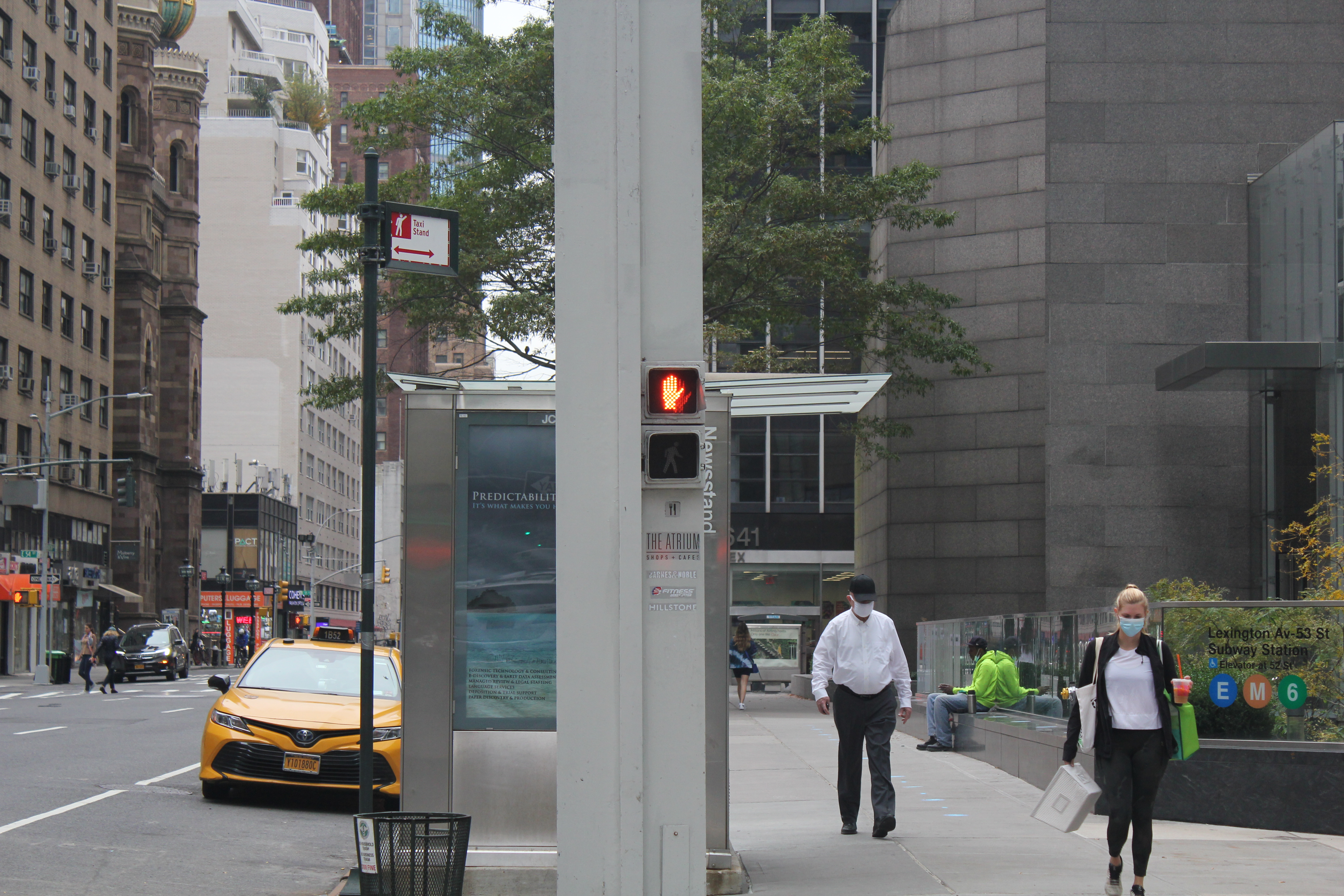
Custom pedestrian traffic signal pylon, northeast corner of Lexington Avenue and 53rd Street

Custom street furniture—including newsstands, flagpoles, and streetlight pylons—was designed for the sidewalks around the Citigroup Center. New Jersey–based company Designetics designed pylons with a cruciform cross-section and street lamps at the top. Seven lighting pylons are placed along the streets that surround the block. Three custom pylons—at the northwest, northeast, and southwest corners of the block (Note: The northwest, northeast, and southwest corners of the block correspond respectively to the corners of Lexington Avenue and 54th Street; Third Avenue and 54th Street; and Lexington Avenue and 53rd Street.)—include pedestrian and vehicular traffic lights. The pylons were initially designed with a "glossy black finish" that contrasted with the tower's aluminum facade; by 2016, they had been painted gray. The New Yorker described the pylons in 2017 as "sculptural towers worthy of Brancusi".

== History ==
First National City Bank (later Citibank) was founded in 1812 and, for over a century, had its headquarters in the Financial District of Lower Manhattan. The company was headquartered at 52 Wall Street until 1908, when it moved to 55 Wall Street. After National City Bank and the Farmers' Loan and Trust Company merged in 1929, the new company, City Bank Farmers Trust, moved into a new structure at 20 Exchange Place, which was completed in 1931, and opened a Midtown office at 399 Park Avenue, one block west of the present Citigroup Center, in 1961.

On the northwestern corner of the future Citigroup Center site was St. Peter's Lutheran Church, which had been founded in 1862 as a German-speaking congregation. (Note: Schmertz 1978, p. 112, erroneously states that St. Peter's was founded at Lexington Avenue and 54th Street; the church was established several blocks south at 46th Street.) The St. Peter's congregation occupied a building at Lexington Avenue and 46th Street from 1871 to 1902, when it was demolished for the construction of Grand Central Terminal. This prompted the congregation to move to a Gothic building designed by John G. Michel and P. Brandner, which was completed in 1905. The congregation, which at its peak had a membership of over one thousand, had decreased to below 300 by the 1960s, prompting the congregation to consider relocating to near the United Nations headquarters.

=== Planning ===
==== Site acquisition ====
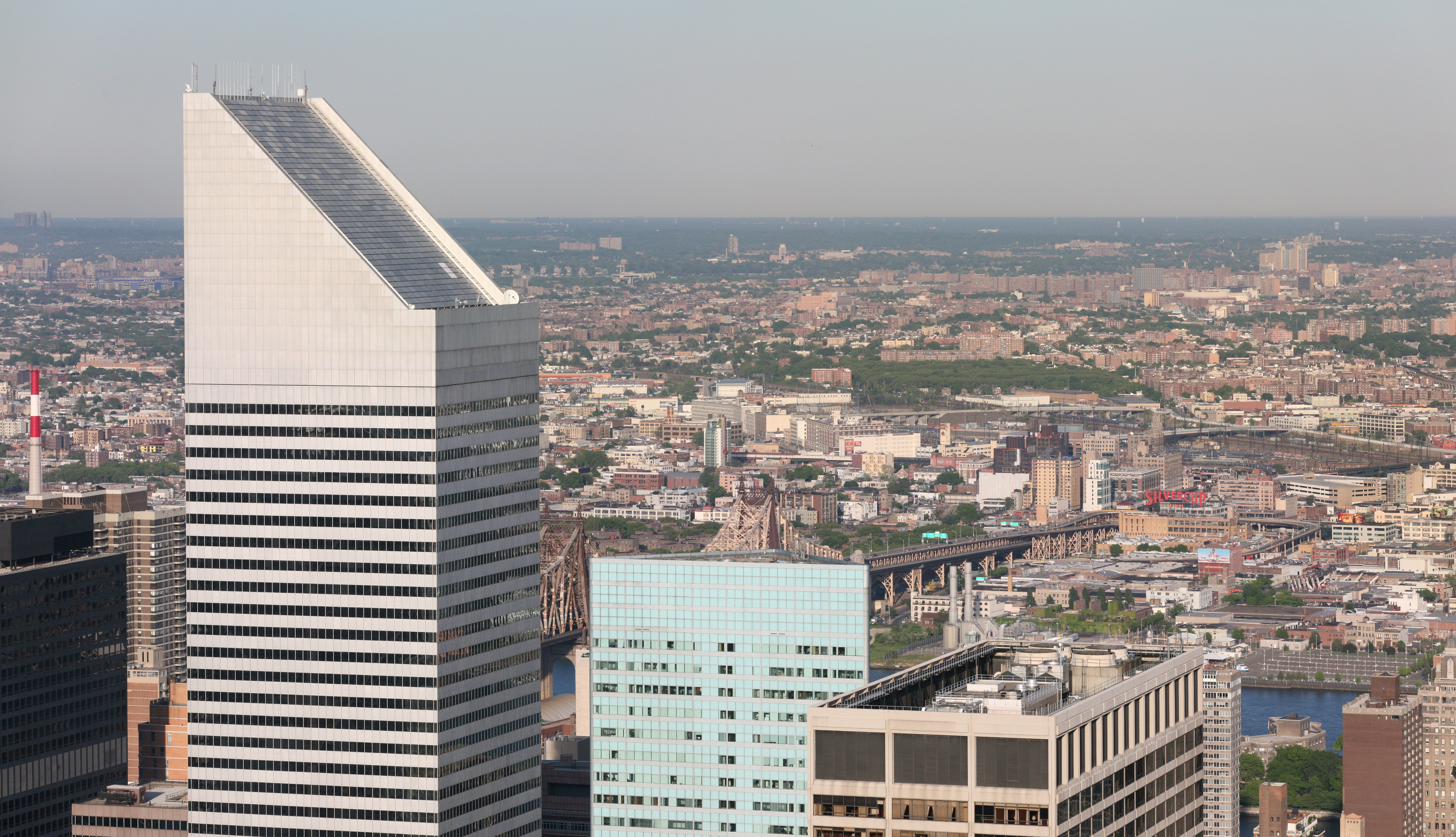
Top of the Citigroup Center (left) as seen from Rockefeller Center

Lots on the St. Peter's block were acquired secretively starting in 1968 and continued for five and a half years. The acquisition was headed by brokers Donald Schnabel and Charles McArthur of Julien J. Studley Inc. The brokers believed that a large, contiguous land lot would be worth more than the sum of each lot's individual worth, though the firm had not yet secured a client for which it was purchasing the lots. St. Peter's Church's membership was increasing again by then, and members of the congregation were loath to part with their property. A Studley broker formed a company called Lexman, which then approached what had become First National City Bank to determine their interest in acquiring the St. Peter's block, one block east of their headquarters at the time. Lexman gradually acquired the other lots on the block.

The brokerage firm again negotiated with St. Peter's congregation in late 1969 after some lots had been acquired. John White, president of consulting firm James D. Landauer Associates, proposed that the new structure on the site be a condominium development; i.e. the church would have a partial ownership stake in the new development. In February 1970, the congregation signed a letter of intent to sell its building, as well as the air rights above the church, to First National City Bank. In exchange, the congregation received $9 million and was named as a condominium partner in the tower's development. The congregation saw a $4 million net profit, as its new building cost $5 million. Members of the congregation formally approved the sale of their building in May 1971.

Hugh Stubbins & Associates was hired to develop plans for a large building on the city block, and St. Peter's Church hired Edward Larrabee Barnes as a design consultant by the beginning of 1971. The Stubbins firm, at the time, had relatively little experience designing high-rise buildings. The New York Times characterized the site as an "annex" to First National City Bank's main building at 399 Park Avenue. The congregation of St. Peter's Church voted in May 1971 to approve the sale of its old building and construct a new structure on the same site, and they relocated in early 1973 to a temporary location at the Central Presbyterian Church. By July 1973, land acquisition was almost entirely complete, although the last parcel was not acquired until November 1975, when the lot at 884 Third Avenue was purchased. The parcels cost $40 million, making it the most expensive city block on earth at the time. The only lot on the block that First National City Bank had not acquired was 880 Third Avenue, which had been completed in 1965, and which the brokers considered too new to be demolished.

==== Design process and city approvals ====
In addition to what became the final design, Stubbins and his associates studied at least six alternate proposals for the tower, with varying rooftop designs. Early plans also called for installing stilts underneath each corner. These plans were scrapped because the northwestern stilt would extend into St. Peter's Lutheran Church, and the church wanted its sanctuary to be structurally separate from the tower. Before the official plans for the building were announced, the architects had designed a roof sloped at a 45-degree corner, which was to contain west-facing terraces for about 100 apartments, but the New York City Department of City Planning would not approve a zoning change to permit that use. The architects then rotated the roof southward to accommodate flat-plate solar collectors.

Plans for the project, then known as Citicorp Center, were publicly disclosed on July 24, 1973. The plans called for a 910-foot-tall (280 m) tower with stilts under the center of each side, rising 112 feet (34 m) above street level. The project would also include an eight-story office annex, three stories of retail, a landscaped public plaza, and a new church building. St. Peter's old church building had been demolished by mid-1973, and First National City Bank had become known as Citibank, a subsidiary of Citicorp. St. Peter's pastor Ralph E. Peterson described the project as "a very bold venture in an urban environment". In part because of Peterson's insistence, the plans included a publicly accessible plaza with shopping available. Early plans for the church also called for it to have a cube design; the church's final design, with a diagonal skylight, was announced in April 1974. The city government approved plans for Citicorp Center the same year.

=== Construction ===
Groundbreaking ceremonies for the tower were hosted in April 1974, but work began only twelve months later. The tower's construction was supervised by Vivian Longo, who, at the building's completion in 1977, was twenty-five years old. Citicorp Center was one of the few large structures in Manhattan that were being erected in the mid-1970s. At the peak of construction, three thousand people were employed, and 565 workers were on site simultaneously. The steel framework had been completed to the eighteenth floor by the end of 1975. When the frame topped out on October 7, 1976, officials predicted Citicorp Center would be the only major structure in New York City to be completed in 1977.

The cornerstone for the new St. Peter's Church was laid on November 1, 1976. Citibank acquired two buildings at 148 and 152 East 53rd Street, immediately south of the new tower, the next month. The company did not intend to develop the sites of these buildings, but they contained topless bars, which Citibank officials perceived would decrease the value of the tower. The bank's vice president for real estate management, Arthur E. Driscoll, had studied vacancy rates at fourteen nearby "prime office buildings" while Citicorp Center was being developed. The first tenants moved to the office building in April 1977. By that August, Citicorp Center was 96 percent rented, even though average rents were higher than in other buildings nearby.

=== Early years ===
==== Opening ====
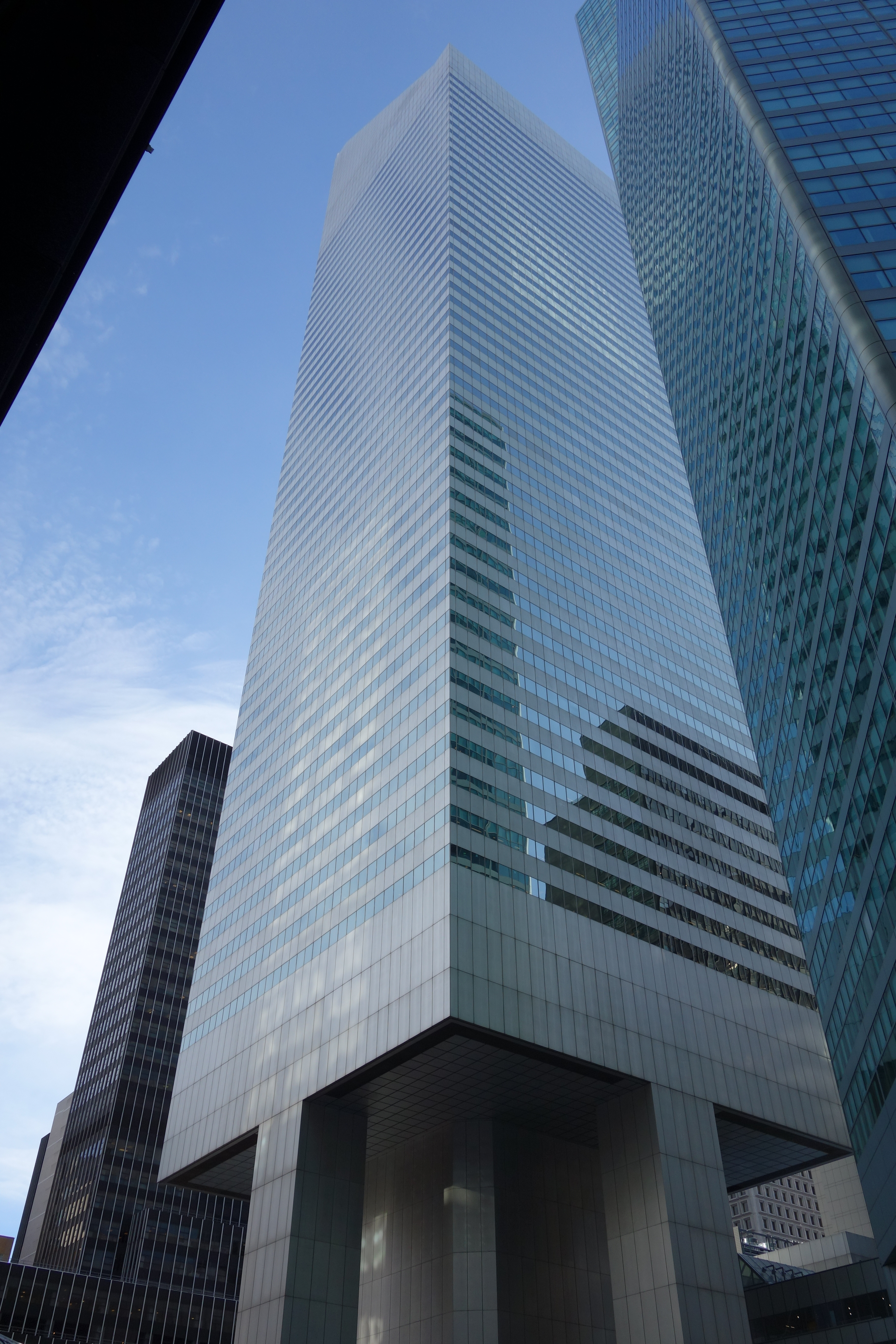
Viewed from Lexington Avenue

The office tower was dedicated on October 12, 1977. Stubbins gave an opening speech in which he described the building as a "skyscraper for the people". Almost all the space within the retail complex at the building's base, known as the Market, had been rented, and over 300 retailers had applied to operate storefronts in the Market. The majority of the Market's space was rented by household furnishings retailer Conran's, which occupied 40,000 square feet (3,700 m^{2}), but some of the other retailers included restaurants serving cuisine of various countries. Citibank planned to occupy 600,000 square feet (56,000 m^{2}), or 26 stories, moving its offices to the building from five other addresses in Midtown. The remaining stories were occupied by a variety of firms, including those in law and accounting, as well as the Consulate-General of Japan and technology company IBM.

At the time of Citicorp Center's dedication, the final design features of St. Peter's Church were being installed. St. Peter's Church was dedicated on December 4, 1977, and the Nevelson Chapel was separately dedicated the same month. Initially, the tower's slanted roof created an ice problem during winter, as snow and ice would slide down the roof onto the sidewalk. Furthermore, the shopping concourse was initially only lightly used and largely unknown to the public. The plaza on Lexington Avenue opened by July 1978. In the complex's early years, St. Peter's Church encountered fiscal deficits because of high utility costs, as well as inflation and lack of investment experience, even though the church earned money from renting out some of the other space it owned at Citicorp Center. By 1980, Citicorp counted 25,000 daily visitors to the shopping concourse, but some of the stores had already closed down because of a lack of patronage.

==== 1978 engineering crisis ====
Due to material changes during construction, the building as completed was vulnerable to collapse in high winds. LeMessurier's original design for the chevron load braces had used welded joints. To save money, Bethlehem Steel changed the plans in 1974 to use bolted joints, which was accepted by LeMessurier's office but not known to the engineer himself. Furthermore, LeMessurier originally only needed to calculate wind loads from perpendicular winds, as required under the building code; in typical buildings, loads from quartering winds at the corners would be less. In June 1978, after an inquiry from engineering student Diane Hartley, LeMessurier recalculated the wind loads on the building with quartering winds. LeMessurier found that quartering winds would significantly increase the load at the bolted joints. After conducting tests on the building's structural safety, he found that a wind capable of toppling Citicorp Center would have a 1-in-55 chance of occurring in an average year, or a 1-in-16 chance of happening if the tuned mass damper (TMD) on the roof was powered off.

LeMessurier proposed welding steel plates over the bolted joints, and Karl Koch Erecting was hired for the welding process. Starting in August 1978, construction crews installed the welded panels at night. The fixes were completed that October, after which LeMessurier claimed that a wind strong enough to topple the building would have a 1-in-700 chance of occurring in any given year. The work was not publicized at the time, as it took place during the 1978 New York City newspaper strike and very few people were notified of the issue. Since no structural failure occurred, the extent of the engineering crisis was only publicly revealed in a lengthy article in The New Yorker in 1995. A National Institute of Standards and Technology reassessment of the engineering crisis in 2019, using modern technology, indicated that the quartering wind loads were not as severe as LeMessurier and Hartley had thought.

==== 1980s and 1990s ====
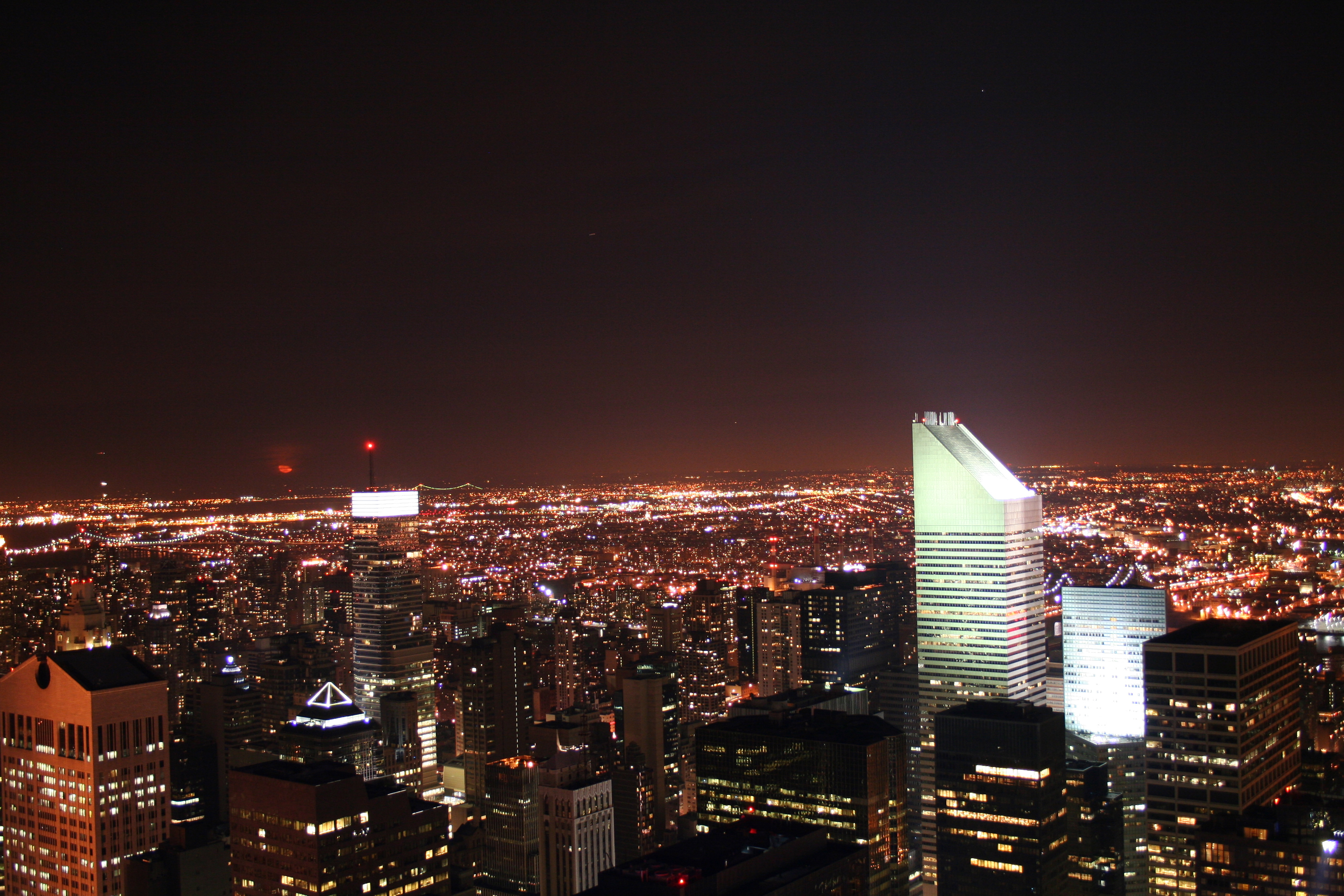
Night view of the Citigroup Center (at right) from Rockefeller Center

As completed, Citicorp Center was divided into three separate condominium-style ownership stakes. One condominium was owned by the church, while the other two were 61.55 and 32.85 percent ownership stakes in the office stories. In October 1987, Citicorp sold the 61.55 percent ownership stake (consisting of the 23rd through 59th floors), along with a one-third stake in its former 399 Park Avenue headquarters, to Daiichi Life for $670 million. Citicorp used the profits from the sale to reduce its losses, which in the first half of 1987 totaled $2.32 billion; it continued to own the remaining stories at Citicorp Center. At the time, Citicorp was developing One Court Square across the East River in the Long Island City neighborhood of Queens. The new building in Queens was one subway stop away from Citicorp Center and 399 Park Avenue, allowing Citicorp to split its offices between the buildings.

The Market shopping atrium fell into disrepair in the two decades following Citicorp Center's completion. In May 1995, Citicorp commenced a $15 million, eighteen-month renovation of the shopping concourse, which was designed by Gwathmey Siegel & Associates Architects. The brick pavers were replaced with terrazzo, new signs were installed outside each storefront, and circulation features, such as the placement of escalators, were rearranged. The shopping concourse was renamed the Shops at Citicorp Center and bookstore Barnes & Noble was named as the anchor tenant, taking 40,000 square feet (3,700 m^{2}).

=== 21st century ===
==== 2000s and 2010s ====
By late 2000, Dai-Ichi's broker Jones Lang LaSalle had placed the entirety of the office building (which had since become known as the Citigroup Center) for sale. Dai-Ichi and Citigroup—the latter of which had been formed in 1998 through a merger of Citicorp and the Travelers Companies—arranged to jointly sell both condominium shares. Richard and Eric D. Hadar, a father-and-son venture, bid $725 million for Dai-Ichi's ownership stake in January 2001. For the purchase, Eric Hadar had arranged a $525 million first mortgage from Deutsche Bank and a $150 million mezzanine loan from the government of Singapore. The sale was delayed after Boston Properties offered to buy Dai-Ichi's stake. Eric Hadar's company, Allied Partners, along with Boston Properties, ultimately finalized their purchase of both condominium shares that April. The price was $755 million, including closing costs and taxes, and Citigroup relocated to 399 Park Avenue. One of the stilts was structurally reinforced following the September 11 attacks, and protective bollards were installed on the sidewalk.

Boston Properties bought Allied Partners' stake in the Citigroup Center in 2006 for $100 million. The same year, Boston Properties began rebranding the building as 601 Lexington Avenue. A new Lexington Avenue lobby was constructed and the tower stories' entrance was relocated from 53rd Street to Lexington Avenue. In addition, a ramp was installed on 53rd Street and a reception area was added to the northern entrance of St. Peter's Church. The name change took effect in 2010. Boston Properties was also considering selling naming rights to the building. By 2013, Citigroup only occupied three stories at the Citigroup Center. The next year, Boston Properties sold a 45 percent ownership stake in the Citigroup Center, along with proportional stakes in the Atlantic Wharf Office Building and 100 Federal Street in Boston, to companies associated with Norges Bank Investment Management. These firms paid a combined $1.5 billion.

Boston Properties was contemplating renovations to the building by 2016. The company filed alteration plans for the plaza that July, and it began vacating the space in the office annex. The New York City Landmarks Preservation Commission (LPC) designated the building as a city landmark in December. The same month, Boston Properties announced plans to renovate the office annex, which would be rebranded 159 East 53rd Street. Gensler revealed its design for a refurbished entry plaza and a new atrium space in March 2017, and work on the plaza commenced that June, with the original fountain (which had been part of the landmark designation) being demolished. All of the space in the 159 East 53rd Street annex was leased to NYU Langone Health in 2018. Following the completion of the renovation, in late 2019, Anna Castellani signed a lease for a 10,000-square-foot (930 m^{2}) food hall at the base of the Citigroup Center. In October 2019, London-based company etc.venues agreed to operate a 30,000-square-foot (2,800 m^{2}) conference center on the 14th floor.

==== 2020s to present ====
In 2021, St. Peter's Church at the Citigroup Center was seriously damaged after a broken water main flooded its space; the church underwent emergency repairs, which took a year to complete. In addition, Boston Properties converted the shopping concourse into a food hall named the Hugh. Boston Properties and Norges Bank Investment Management refinanced the Citigroup Center in December 2021 with a $1 billion mortgage from four banks. At the time, the building's office space was 96.3 percent occupied, and the tenants largely included financial firms and law offices. With about 326,000 square feet (30,300 m^{2}) of space, the Blackstone Group was one of the building's largest tenants in 2022. Other large tenants by then included Citibank, Kirkland & Ellis, and Freshfields Bruckhaus Deringer.

== Architecture ==
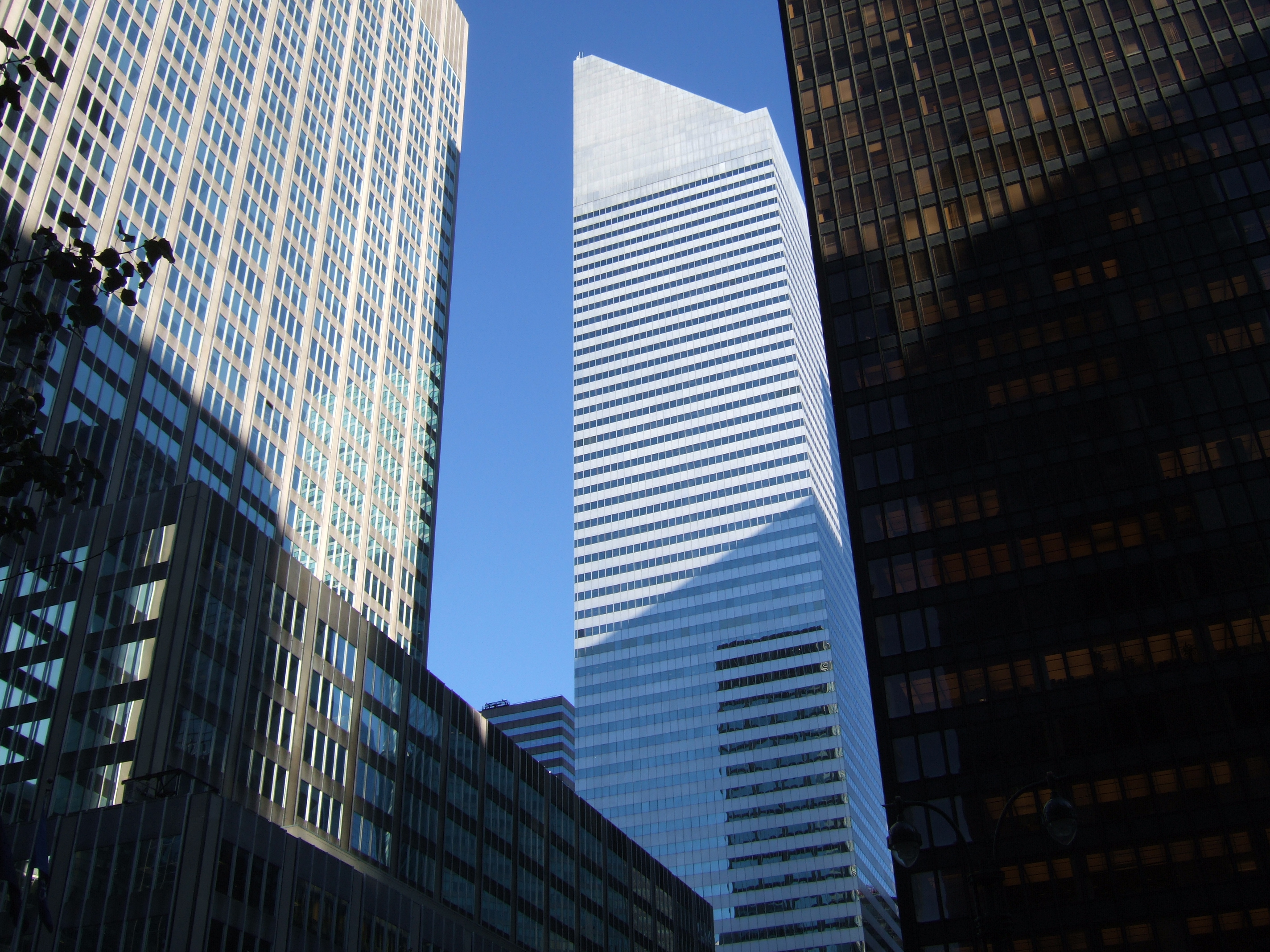
The Citigroup Center as seen from Park Avenue, between 399 Park Avenue to the left and the Seagram Building to the right

The Citigroup Center consists of three structures: the office tower, the annex, and a sanctuary for St. Peter's Church at the base of the office tower. The tower was designed by architect Hugh Stubbins, along with associate architects Emery Roth & Sons, for the First National City Bank (later Citibank). Of the other principals at Hugh A. Stubbins & Associates, architect Peter Woytuk was most involved in the design, while project manager W. Easley Hammer oversaw the construction. In addition, Edward Larrabee Barnes was the consulting architect, and LeMessurier Associates and James Ruderman were the structural engineers. The general contractor was the HRH Construction Corporation (which was acquired by the Starrett Housing Corporation during the building's construction), and the steel contractor was Bethlehem Steel. Numerous contractors supplied other material for the building.

=== Form and facade ===
The Citigroup Center tower rises 59 stories high, with its roof about 915 feet (279 m) above ground level. (Note: The height is alternatively cited as 914 feet (279 m).) Since it is raised 13 stories above ground, the tower has 46 usable stories. At the time of completion, Citicorp Center was the seventh-tallest or eighth-tallest building in the world, as well as the city's fifth-tallest building. In addition to the primary 59-story tower, there is an annex at 159 East 53rd Street with six or seven stories. It extends east to Third Avenue and includes part of the building's shopping concourse. On 54th Street is a loading dock that serves the tower, annex, and church.

The tower and its annex have similarly-designed facades. The facade is made of anodized aluminum and reflective glass panels. Each facade segment measures 12 by 9 feet (3.7 by 2.7 m) and consists of both glass panes and aluminum plates. To conserve energy, each window is double-glazed; the inner pane is coated with chrome plating. The windows on each floor are separated by flush aluminum spandrels. The spandrels were manufactured by Flour City Architectural Metals, a firm based in Glen Cove, New York. The aluminum is silver-colored, like that on the Pepsi-Cola Building and One Chase Manhattan Plaza, because Stubbins thought a dark color would not allow observers to "see the shade and shadow". The facade is fitted with 2 inches (51 mm) of insulation, double the amount of insulation considered normal at the time of construction. The aluminum was polished to reflect heat from sunlight.

==== Roof ====
The triangular roof of the Citigroup Center rises 160 feet (49 m) above the top story and faces south, sloping at a 45-degree angle. (Note: The roof height is alternatively given as 130 feet (40 m).) The roof was originally intended to face west and contain several terraces, but the architects rotated the roof southward to accommodate flat-plate solar collectors, which they believed would produce hot water that could dehumidify air and reduce the need for other energy for cooling. Starting in February 1975, engineers from the Massachusetts Institute of Technology conducted a twelve-month feasibility study for the installation of such a system. Afterward, the system was scrapped, either because of the smaller-than-expected savings, the cost of the required refined mechanical systems, supplier issues, or the insufficient energy produced by the system.

Even after the solar-collector plans were scrapped, the design was kept; Stubbins wrote that the roof "relieves the uniformity of flat-topped towers proliferating in the center of the city". This made Citicorp Center the first postmodern skyscraper in New York City with an entirely decorative roof. The roof was also fitted with solar panels in 1983, when Consolidated Edison and Citibank sponsored a four-year solar panel test.

=== Plaza ===
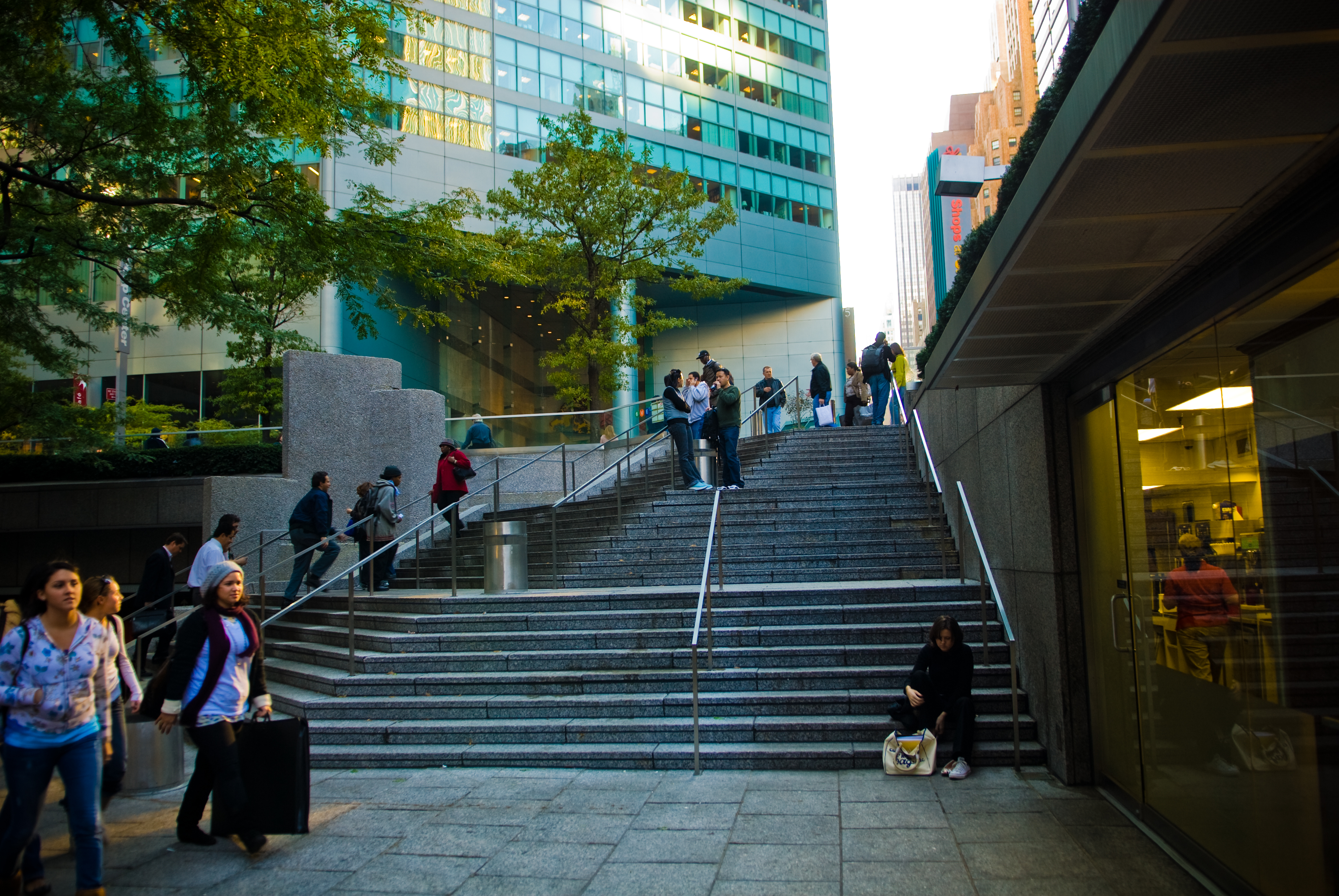
View from the plaza

A large plaza, 12 feet (3.7 m) beneath street level, was designed by landscape architecture firm Sasaki Associates and built along with Citicorp Center. Masao Kinoshita and Stuart Dawson of Sasaki Associates were the architects most responsible for the plaza's design. The plaza's presence was encouraged by the 1961 Zoning Resolution, which gave additional floor area to New York City developers as a zoning "bonus" for including open space outside their buildings. While many developers took advantage of the "bonus", the New York City Planning Commission found in 1975 that many of these plazas ranged from "bleak, forlorn places" to those that were "forbidding and downright hostile". In response, the City Planning Commission's Urban Design Group was formed in 1967 to determine how to improve plaza designs, influencing a design handbook that the City Planning Commission published in 1975. The design of the Citigroup Center's plaza was finalized in 1973, and it included many of the same features described in the handbook, such as an outdoor plaza, a covered pedestrian area, and an arcade running for a city block.

The plaza has an area of 6,000 square feet (560 m^{2}). Under the zoning laws, its presence allowed the tower to be designed with a maximum floor area ratio of 18:1, higher than the 15:1 ratio specified for the area. The plaza is accessed by a diagonally-oriented stairway extending northeast from the corner of Lexington Avenue and 53rd Street. On the south side of the plaza is an entrance to the Lexington Avenue/51st Street subway station. The Citigroup Center's entrance replaces two previous subway entrances on the sidewalk. The north side of the plaza contains the entrance to St. Peter's Church. During the plaza's construction, the developers collaborated with the numerous public agencies that had a stake in the project, including the Metropolitan Transportation Authority, which operated the subway station.

The plaza, interior shopping concourse, and sidewalks all initially contained brown brick floor pavers. Several large planters, benches, and honey locust trees were spread across the plaza. There was originally also a fountain at the center of the plaza, which was designed to conceal noise from the environs, similar to the fountain at nearby Paley Park. That fountain, designed in the Brutalist style, was demolished in 2017. None of the plaza's original decorations remain. The modern-day plaza has stepped waterfalls on its western and southern walls.

==== St. Peter's Lutheran Church ====
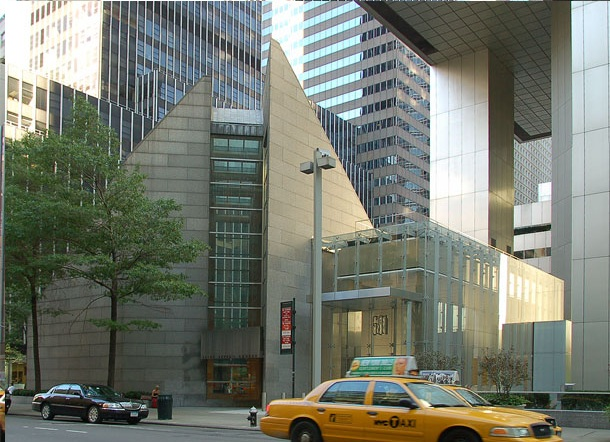
St. Peter's Church as seen from the south

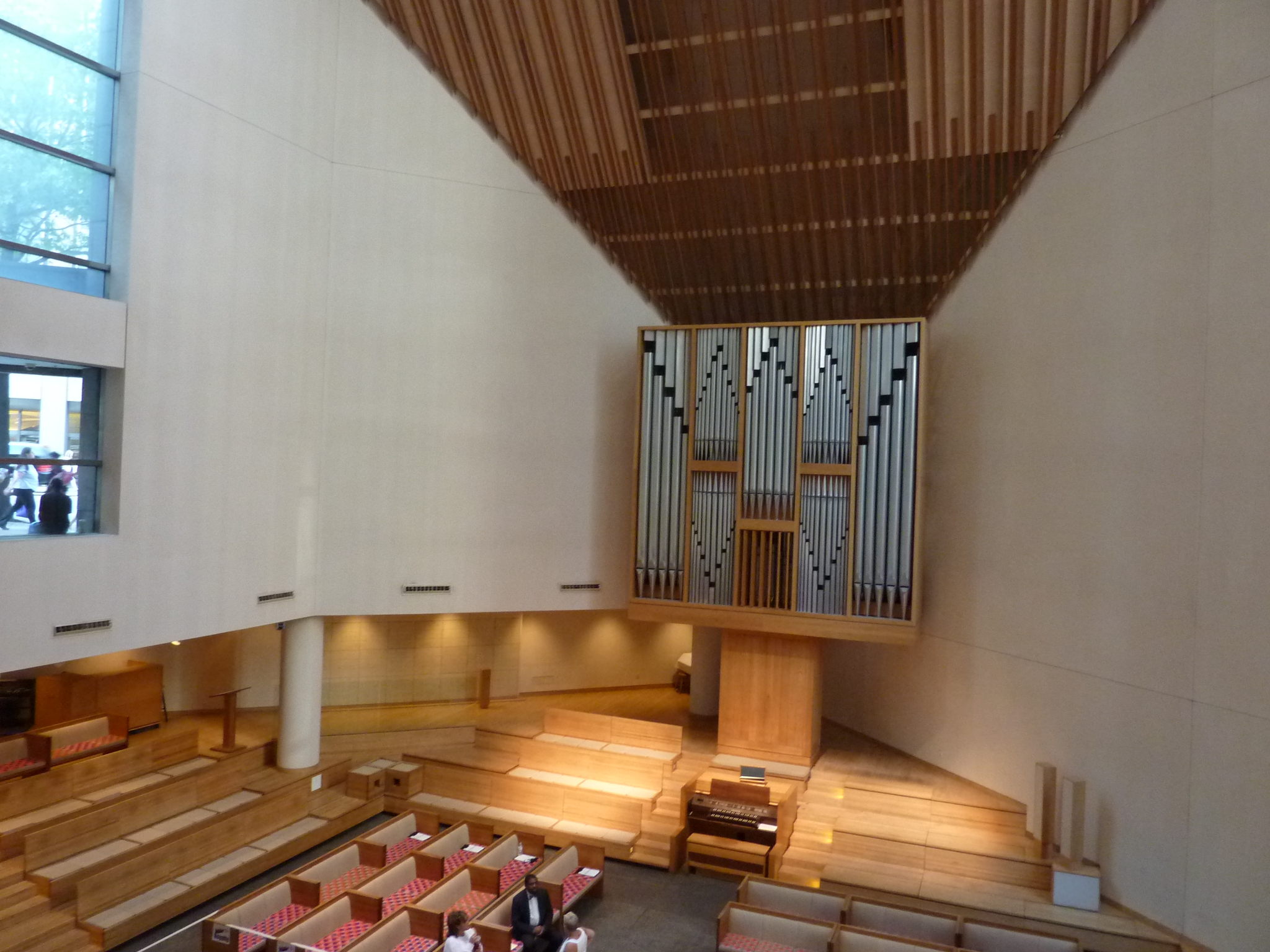
Interior of St. Peter's Church

At the northwest corner of Citigroup Center is St. Peter's Lutheran Church at 619 Lexington Avenue. The exterior was designed by Stubbins and Hammer, while the interior was furnished by Vignelli Associates. The church's congregation permitted Citicorp to erect the office tower only if an edifice, structurally unconnected to the tower, were built at the same location as the congregation's old building. Andrew Alpern and Seymour Durst characterized the agreement as "ecumenically joining God and mammon to the benefit of both". In addition, at least 63 percent of the church was to have "nothing built above it". According to Stubbins, the lack of structural connections would give the church a "breathing space" of its own. The church was described by the architectural writer David W. Dunlap in 2004 as the city's "most architecturally successful postwar sanctuary". The church originally connected directly to Citigroup Center's annex, but the connection was removed in the mid-2000s due to security concerns caused by the September 11 attacks.

The structure rises about 60 feet (18 m) above ground and 85 feet (26 m) above the plaza. The majority of the building has a facade of brown Caledonia granite interspersed with ashlar. The copper roof is coated with lead. The materials were meant to establish a distinct identity for the church while also associating it with the office tower. A skylight bisects the roof from southwest to northeast, allowing passersby to look inside. There are vertical windows under both ends of the skylight. Another window at the corner of Lexington Avenue and 54th Street overlooks the pipe organ inside. To the east on 54th Street is a single-story addition with an aluminum facade, resembling the office tower's facade, which contains a secondary entrance to the Nevelson Chapel and the church's narthex. A third entrance leads south to the plaza and subway entrance. Stubbins had intended the structure's shape to resemble a pair of hands held up in prayer, while other observers compared it to a tent or a rock. Arnaldo Pomodoro designed a bronze cross for the exterior, which was installed in 1982 and measures 8 feet (2.4 m) tall by 6 feet (1.8 m) wide.

The interior is divided into two primary levels. The upper level has a narthex with a reception desk, which is accessed from 54th Street and contains a stairway that descends to a "living room" on the lower level. The narthex's western wall contains a doorway to the Nevelson Chapel, which has 24 seats; the chapel is named for its designer, Louise Nevelson. The lower-level living room is a carpeted space with a dropped ceiling, circular columns, and doors leading west to the sanctuary. The sanctuary itself is adjacent to and slightly below the lower plaza, with simple decorations including plaster walls and ceiling, granite floors, and red-oak furniture. The sanctuary has movable pews, which can seat up to 850 people and have cushions with geometric designs created by Vignelli Associates. Upon the church's completion, there was a two-manual, two-pedal organ with 2,175 pipes, positioned in the sanctuary's northwestern corner. There is also a black-box theater, a library, kitchen, daycare center, clergy offices, dressing rooms, choir rooms, and lecture and community rooms. Some of these spaces are in a cellar beneath the lower level.

Over the years, the church's basement theater has been used by the York Theatre. St. Peter's Church also hosts a jazz ministry created by the Rev. John Garcia Gensel, who in 1965 became the Minister to the Jazz Community. The jazz ministry has sponsored several programs over the years, such as free jazz performances at the base of the office tower. The church has hosted memorials and funerals for jazz musicians such as Miles Davis, Dizzy Gillespie, and Thelonious Monk.

=== Structural features ===
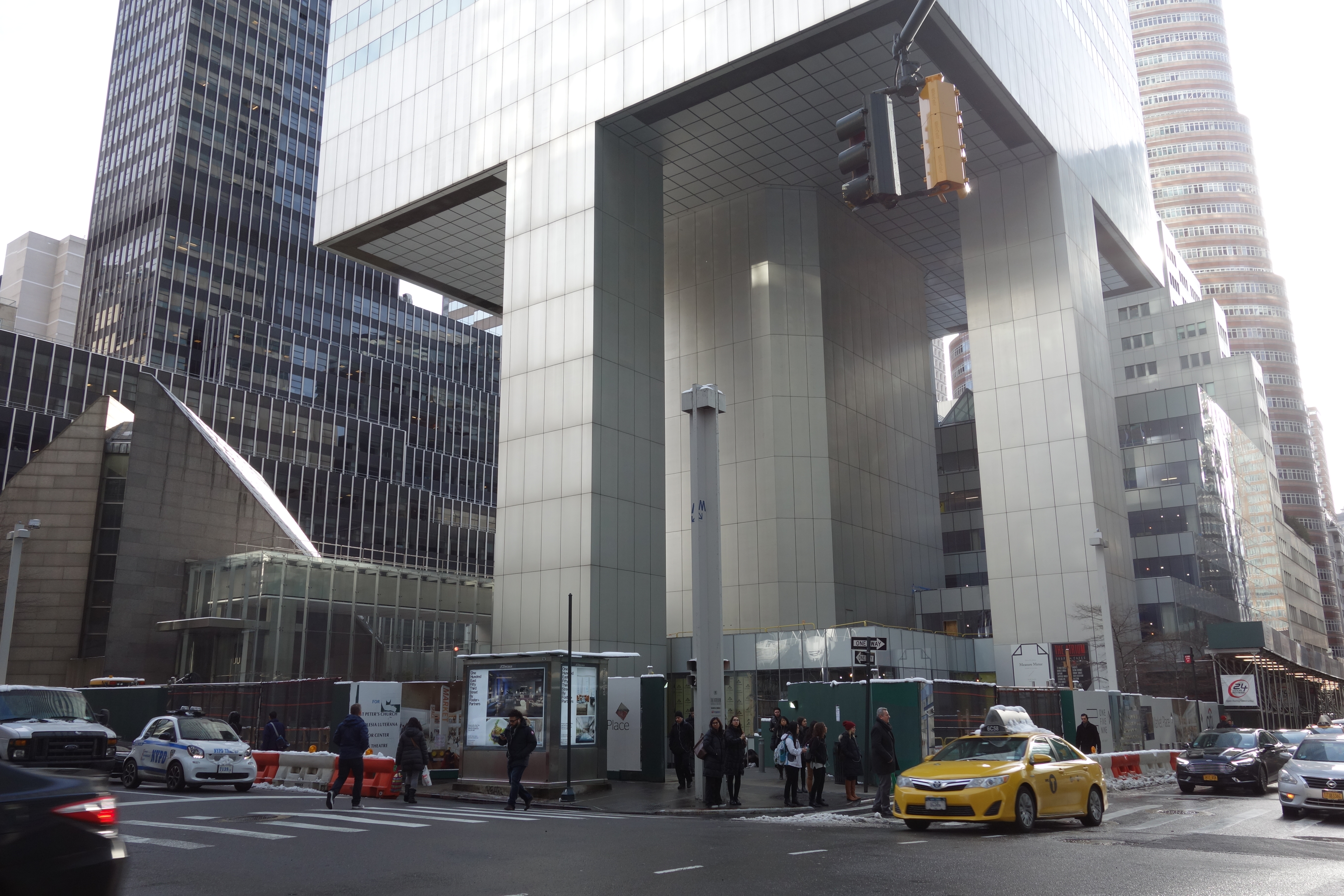
Base of the Citigroup Center. St. Peter's Evangelical Lutheran Church is visible to the left below the skyscraper; the location of the church influenced the columns' locations.

The tower stories are of trussed-tube construction. Each of the tower stories measures 157 by 157 feet (48 by 48 m), or 24,600 square feet (2,290 m^{2}) in total. Within the office stories, the elevator shafts and emergency stairs are embedded in a service core at the center of each story. The core is about 68 by 68 feet (21 by 21 m), while the floor space around the core is just less than 45 feet (14 m) wide. Overall, the Citigroup Center is made of 24,000 short tons (21,000 long tons; 22,000 t) of steel, two-fifths of the amount used in the Empire State Building.

==== Stilts ====
The tower is supported by four stilts measuring approximately 112 feet (34 m) high with a cross section of 24 by 24 feet (7.3 by 7.3 m). (Note: A New York Times article says that the columns are 114 feet (35 m) high with a cross section of 22 by 22 feet (6.7 by 6.7 m).) The stilts are underneath the centers of each elevation of the facade, and the building's corners are cantilevered 72 feet (22 m) outward from the core. According to Stanley Goldstein of LeMessurier's New York City office, stilts at the centers of each elevation would be able to withstand forces from "quartering winds" from the corners, compared to stilts at the corners. Additionally, the stilts allowed the building to have a smaller foundation than in a conventional building of similar size.

Each of the individual stilts is composed of four vertical beams; the outer pairs of beams are much heavier than the inner pairs. This design prevents the stilt from buckling. Inside the stilts are emergency stairs and mechanical ducts. In 2002, following the September 11 attacks the previous year, one of the stilts was reinforced with blast-resistant shields of steel and copper as well as steel bracing. There is also an octagonal elevator core in the middle of the building, which measures 63 by 72 feet (19 by 22 m) and carries half of the building's gravity-related structural loads. This elevator core has an aluminum facade and contains 20 elevators. Beneath the lowest office story, the core contains only elevators, and the emergency staircases are within the stilts.

==== Chevrons ====
Above the stilts, within the walls, are stacked load-bearing braces in the form of inverted chevrons. Each elevation of the facade has six chevrons, which are eight stories tall. The wind loads from each eight-story tier are transferred into the center of the frame, where 60-inch-wide (1,500 mm) "mast column transports" extend the tower's entire height. The mast columns are 30 inches (760 mm) deep at their bases, tapering to 18 inches (460 mm) above the 40th floor. The diagonal beams in each chevron are 14 inches (360 mm) deep and connect to spandrel panels at the top of each eight-story tier, which are 36 inches (910 mm) deep. The tops of each eight-story tier (where the diagonal beams meet the building's corners) do not have vertical columns, thus preventing wind loads from accumulating at the tower's corners.

The ninth story, the lowest level above the stilts, contains a trussed frame similar to those use in cantilever bridges, where the wind loads are transferred downward into the stilts. This story is used as mechanical space.

The chevrons are not visible from the exterior but can be seen from the offices inside; this contrasted with structures such as Chicago's John Hancock Center in which the diagonal beams could be seen from the outside. After Citicorp Center's completion, W. Easley Hammer said he thought it was a mistake to conceal the chevrons, while LeMessurier said that Stubbins had rejected his idea for exposed chevrons. The chevrons were originally bolted to each other with over two hundred joints. Following the Citicorp Center engineering crisis of 1978, workers installed 2-inch-thick (51 mm) steel plates over each joint.

=== Interior ===
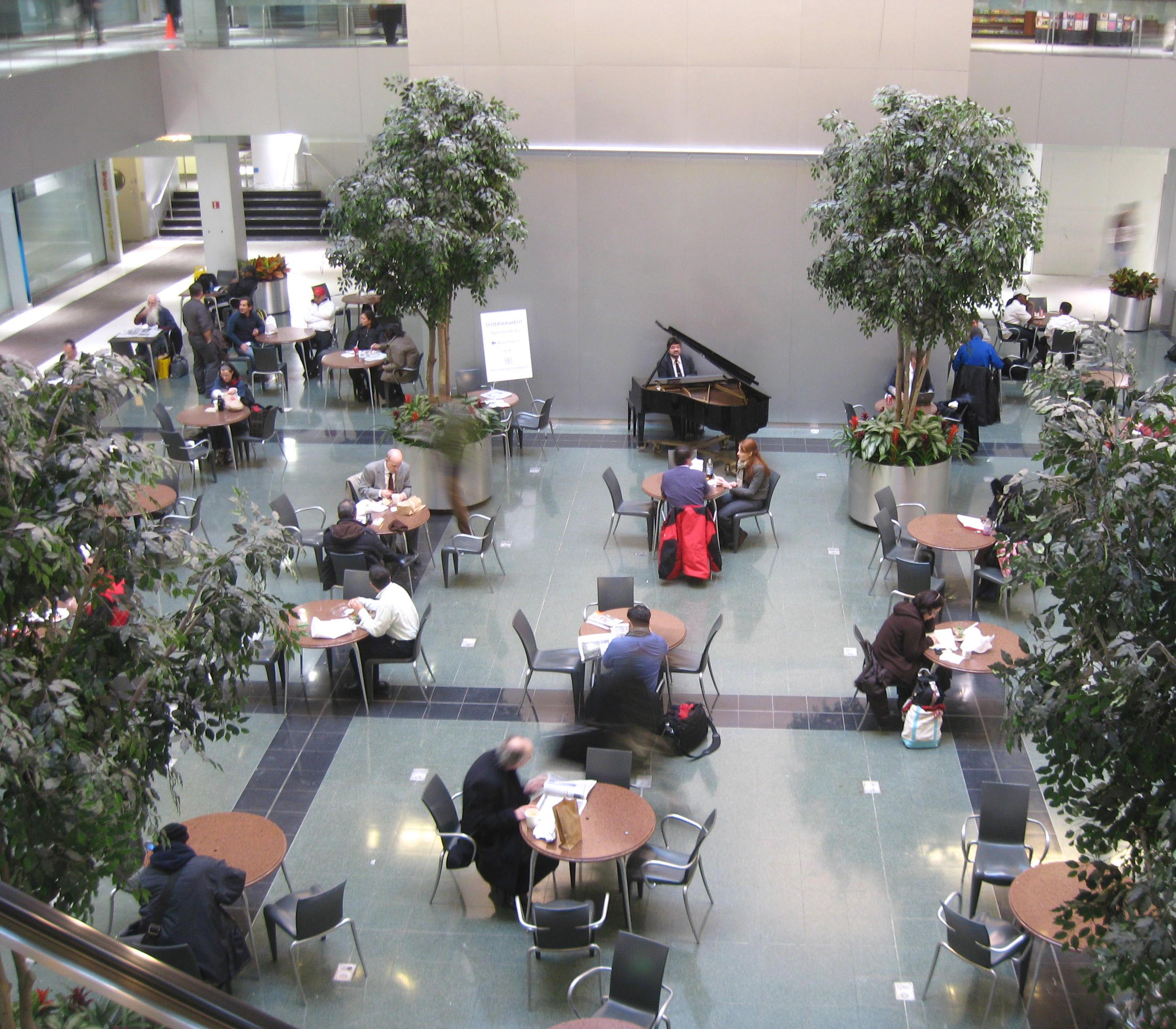
Public lobby

The tower contains approximately 1.3 million square feet (120,000 m^{2}) of rentable space. The office annex to the east contains about 270,000 square feet (25,000 m^{2}) of space. According to the Department of City Planning, the building has a gross floor area of 1,654,020 square feet (153,663 m^{2}), while, according to The Skyscraper Center, the building has 1,578,883 square feet (146,683.0 m^{2}).

==== Base ====
Entrances to the office tower from Lexington Avenue and 53rd Street adjoin the plaza to the north and east, respectively. The Citigroup Center's main lobby is accessed from the Lexington Avenue entrance, across a footbridge that also provides entrance to St. Peter's Church. The main entrance consists of a double-height glass box with steel ribs, measuring 70 feet (21 m) long. The lobby was constructed as part of a 2010 renovation. At plaza level is another entrance designed by Hugh Stubbins Associates' successor KlingStubbins, which is made of glass and aluminum.

There is a three-story shopping concourse at the base of the stilts, originally called the Market. The lowest level, corresponding to the lower lobby, includes a plant-filled atrium measuring 85 feet (26 m) high, with a skylight measuring 90 by 100 feet (27 by 30 m). The corner of Third Avenue and 54th Street contained an entrance to the lowest level of the shopping concourse, while on 54th Street was an entrance to the second level. The storefronts were designed to blend in with the plaza and street, with similar floor surfaces and transparent exterior walls. Overall, the stores were intended as a commitment to the city, a corporate symbol, and a tourist attraction, according to one of Citicorp's vice presidents, Arthur E. Driscoll. From 1987 to 2008, the bank presented a model train exhibition in the space each December. The shopping concourse was renamed The Shops at Citicorp Center in 1995, and it was known as the Atrium by 2016.

==== Mechanical features ====
In the office stories, the elevators and stairs are clustered in a central core. The building contains 20 double-deck elevators, which Otis Worldwide constructed for $7 million. Although each of the upper or lower decks serves only odd or even floors, visitors can travel between odd and even floors using escalators. Each of the elevators consists of two standard elevator cabs that operate simultaneously in one shaft. The elevators cost 25 percent more than standard elevators but allowed for a 24 percent reduction in the floor area taken up by elevators, as twenty-six single-deck elevator shafts would have been required otherwise. The Citigroup Center's double-deck elevators were likely the first to be installed in New York City since 1932, when the Cities Service Building was completed. In total, the Citigroup Center has 38 elevators.

At Citicorp Center's completion, a "supermail" system delivered each tenant's mail. Incoming mail was sorted in the basement and transferred via lifts to each floor, where the mail was transported manually to fixed bins. The building also contained 2,500 sensors to monitor the mechanical systems, such as HVAC, lighting, electrical, sprinkler, life-safety, security, and elevator systems. The sloped roof houses mechanical equipment.

The building was intended to be energy-efficient compared to its contemporaries. Its water supply consisted entirely of cold water; heat from the building's mechanical systems was recirculated to warm the water and the office spaces. The office spaces were cooled with outside air wherever it was practical. The fluorescent light bars in the ceiling, manufactured by Joseph Loring & Associates, were fitted with glass shields to spread artificial light across a wider area. Even though the rooftop solar collectors were not installed, the other features were intended to reduce energy use by up to 42 percent, compared with a regular office building of the same size. During the summer, the building used a conventional air-conditioning system, offsetting any energy saved by the heat-deflecting facade.

Citicorp Center was the city's first skyscraper to feature a tuned mass damper. Located within the rooftop mechanical space, the TMD is designed to counteract swaying motions due to wind and reduces wind-related movement by up to fifty percent. The equipment weighs 400 short tons (360 long tons; 360 t) and includes a concrete block measuring 30 by 30 by 6 feet (9.1 by 9.1 by 1.8 m). The block sits on an oil-coated steel plate and has two spring mechanisms, one each to counteract north–south and east–west movement. The equipment cost around $1.5 million to install. By comparison, it would have cost $5 million to reduce the tower's movement by adding 2,800 short tons (2,500 long tons; 2,500 t) of additional steel.

== Impact ==
=== Reception ===
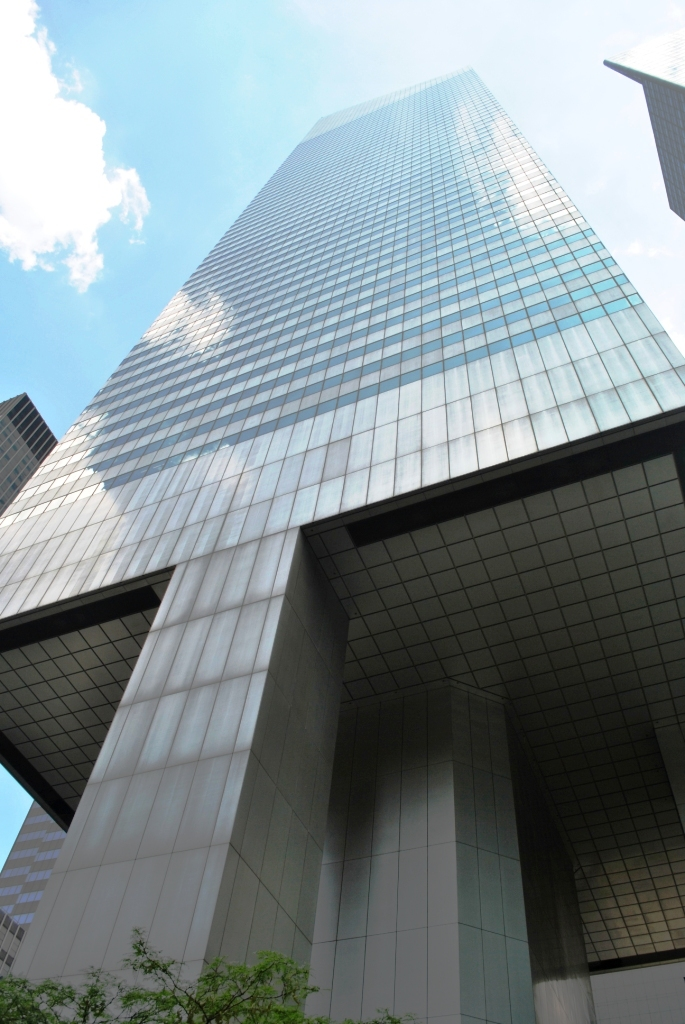
Close-up of the base

As one of three office buildings approved in Manhattan during 1974, Citicorp Center received much media attention during its construction. After the design was announced, the architectural writer Ada Louise Huxtable criticized the design in The New York Times, saying that the tower "has neither romanticism nor structural rationalism but, instead, appears to have been painstakingly invented with a tortured logic through a series of pragmatic and esthetic compromises". As the building was being completed, Huxtable took a less harsh tone, saying that it contained a "clear desire for design quality" despite the drawbacks of the form and roof. A writer for the New York Daily News described the building as being a typical New York City office structure that would only attract notice if it were built elsewhere. A New York magazine writer, Suzanne Stephens, stated that the building was simply a modified version of a 1950s skyscraper, considering the rooftop and base to be wasteful with space.

After the building's completion, it had mixed reception. The architectural critic Paul Goldberger wrote for The New York Times that the roof was unusual and that the building had a reflective facade and a varied form, but that the overall design was not particularly innovative. Another architectural critic, Jack Egan, similarly wrote for The Washington Post that the building had distinctive design features but did not appeal to either nostalgia or novel innovation. Huxtable regarded the plaza as an architectural success but observed in January 1978 that very few people used it. August Heckscher II, a former New York City parks commissioner, described the interior as "an amenity in which we can all rejoice". Nevertheless, Heckscher believed the atrium's silver cladding and light fixtures to be unwelcoming and suggestive of the indoors, and Stephens said that the benefits of the atrium did not transcend class boundaries.

Other critics described Citicorp Center in a largely positive light. The historian and writer John Tauranac described the tower as the "most dramatic new skyscraper" in New York City since the completion of 30 Rockefeller Plaza several decades prior. The architect and writer Robert A. M. Stern said Citicorp Center was the summation of the "unique architectural and urbanistic character that made Fifty-third Street at once an enclave within midtown and a microcosm of midtown itself". The urbanist and sociologist William H. Whyte spoke positively of the structure for its juxtaposition of design elements, such as the exterior plaza and sidewalk. The building was also praised by publications outside the New York City area. The Baltimore Sun described the building as being simultaneously sophisticated and simple-looking, while The Observer of London wrote that the building was a "unique contribution" to the skyline of Manhattan's East Side.

=== Awards, landmark designations, and use as icon ===
Upon Citicorp Center's completion, it received several architectural awards. In 1978, the City Club of New York gave the building a Bard Award, which recognized "excellence in architecture and urban design". The same year, the American Institute of Steel Construction gave its Architectural Award of Excellence to Citicorp for the building's design. The American Institute of Architects (AIA) gave Citicorp an Honor Award in 1979, and Hugh Stubbins and Associates received the AIA's R.S. Reynolds Memorial Award in 1981 for using aluminum in Citicorp Center's design. The AIA's 2007 List of America's Favorite Architecture ranked the Citigroup Center 125th on a list of the top 150 buildings in the United States.

In mid-2016, the Landmarks Preservation Commission proposed protecting twelve buildings in East Midtown, including the Citigroup Center, in advance of proposed changes to the area's zoning. On December 6, 2016, the LPC designated the Citigroup Center as a city landmark. The designation made the Citigroup Center the city's youngest landmark at that time. St. Peter's Church at the Citigroup Center was added to the National Register of Historic Places in 2025.

The sloped roof of the building has been used for branding purposes. For instance, it is included on the label of Chock full o'Nuts coffee. In addition, the top left corner of the first "M" in Manhattan Mini Storage's logo was sloped to resemble the Citigroup Center's roof.

== See also ==
- List of New York City Designated Landmarks in Manhattan from 14th to 59th Streets
- List of tallest buildings in New York City
- List of tallest buildings in the United States
- List of tallest freestanding steel structures
