= Citicorp Center engineering crisis =

1978 discovery of structural flaw in New York City

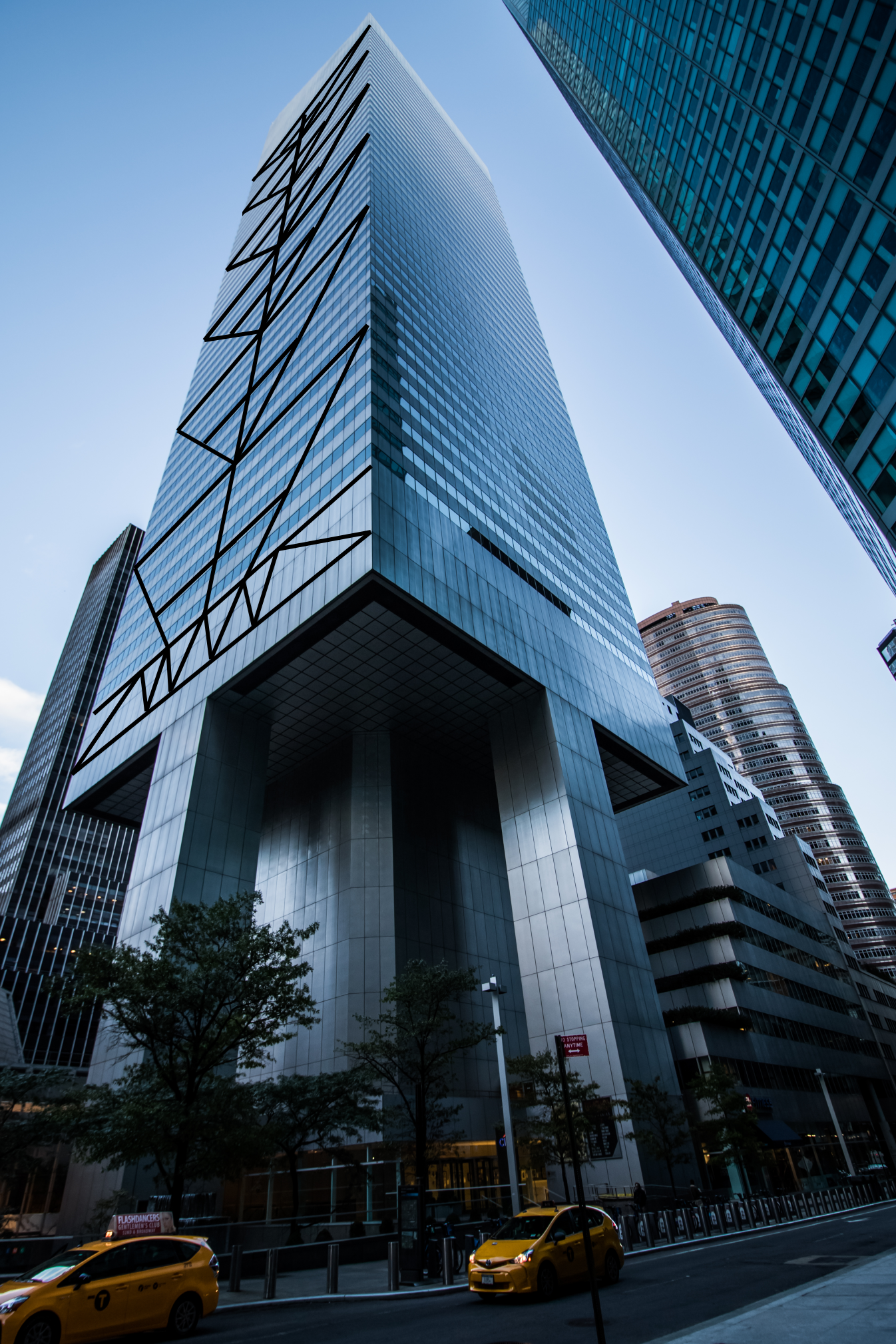
Citigroup building with a sketch of internal framework superimposed on one side. The same design is used on all four sides and transmits wind and gravity loads to the four support stilts. There is also a fifth support column in the center.

In July 1978, a possible structural flaw was discovered in Citicorp Center (now Citigroup Center), a skyscraper that had recently been completed in New York City. After investigations from a number of third parties, the building was found to be in danger of possible collapse due to its design; workers surreptitiously made repairs over the next few months, avoiding disaster.

The building's structural engineer, William LeMessurier, incorporated numerous unconventional features into the design. Among these are a raised base supported by four offset stilts, diagonal bracing to absorb wind loads from upper stories, and a tuned mass damper on the roof. It was the first building that used active mechanical elements (the tuned mass damper) for stabilization.

Concerned about "quartering winds" directed diagonally toward the corners of the building, Princeton University undergraduate student Diane Hartley investigated the structural integrity of the building and found it wanting. Nearly simultaneously, an architecture student at New Jersey Institute of Technology (NJIT) named Lee DeCarolis chose the building as the topic for a report assignment in his freshman class on the basic concepts of structural engineering. John Zoldos of NJIT expressed reservations to DeCarolis about the building's structure, and DeCarolis contacted LeMessurier, relaying what his professor had said. LeMessurier had also become aware that during the construction of the building, changes had been made to his design without his approval, and he reviewed the calculations of the building's stress parameters and the results of wind tunnel experiments. He concluded there was a problem. Worried that a high wind could cause the building to collapse, LeMessurier directed that the building be reinforced.

The reinforcements were done at night while the offices in the building were open for regular operation during the day. The concern was for the integrity of the building structure in high wind conditions. Estimates at the time suggested that if the mass damper was disabled by a power failure, the building could be toppled by a 70-mile-per-hour (110 km/h) quartering wind, with possibly many people killed as a result. The reinforcement effort was kept secret until 1995. The tuned mass damper has a major effect on the stability of the structure, so an emergency backup generator was installed and extra staff was assigned to ensure that it would keep working reliably during the structural reinforcement.

The city had plans to evacuate the Citicorp Center and other surrounding buildings if high winds did occur. Hurricane Ella did threaten New York during the retrofitting, but it changed course before arriving. Ultimately, the retrofitting may not have been necessary. A NIST reassessment using modern technology later determined that the quartering wind loads were not the threat that LeMessurier and Hartley had thought. They recommended a reevaluation of the original building design to determine if the retrofitting had really been warranted.

== Background ==
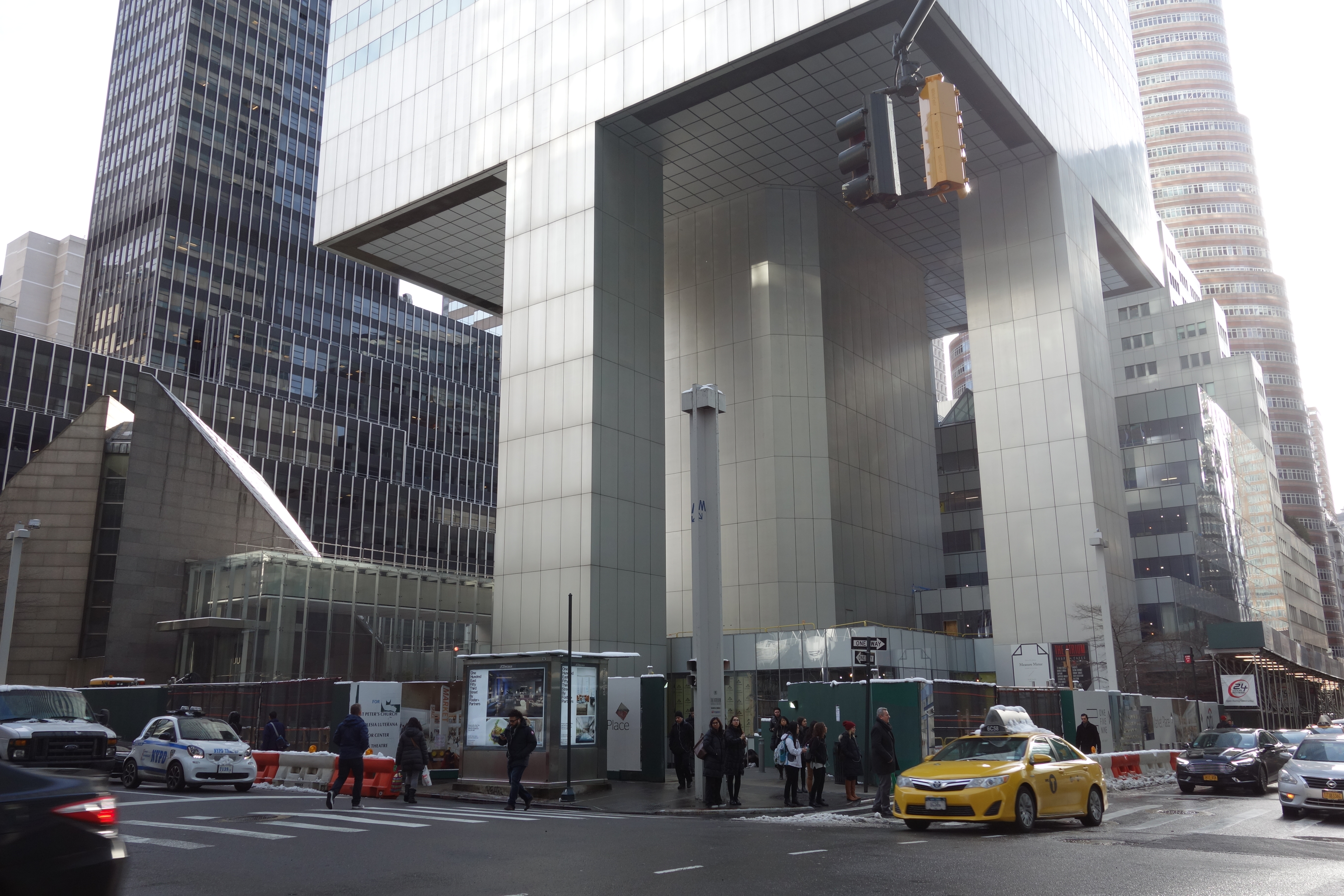
St. Peter's Evangelical Lutheran Church is visible on the left-hand side, below the skyscraper. The church's location necessitated the unusual placement of columns in the center of each face instead of at the corners.

The Citigroup Center, originally known as Citicorp Center, is a 59-story skyscraper at 601 Lexington Avenue in the Midtown Manhattan neighborhood of New York City. It was designed by architect Hugh Stubbins as the headquarters for First National City Bank (later Citibank), along with associate architect Emery Roth & Sons. LeMessurier Associates and James Ruderman were the structural engineers, and Bethlehem Steel was the steel subcontractor. The building was dedicated on October 12, 1977.

As part of Citicorp Center's construction, a new building for the site's previous occupant, St. Peter's Lutheran Church, was erected at the site's northwest corner; by agreement, it was supposed to be separate from the main tower. To avoid the church, the tower is supported by four stilts positioned underneath the centers of each of the tower's edges. (Early plans called for the supports to be placed under the tower's corners, but the agreement with the church prevented that.) To allow this design to work, Bill LeMessurier specified that load-bearing braces in the form of inverted chevrons be stacked above the stilts inside each face of the building. These braces are designed to distribute tension loads created by the wind from the upper stories down to the stilts.

The long, multi-story diagonal braces had to be fabricated in sections and assembled on-site, requiring five joints in each brace. LeMessurier's original design for the chevron load braces used welded joints. To save money, Bethlehem Steel proposed changing the construction plans to use bolted joints, a design modification accepted by LeMessurier's office but unknown to the engineer himself until later.

For his original design, LeMessurier focused primarily on the wind load on the building when the wind blew perpendicularly against the side of the building. Although he had initially studied winds from various directions, he had concluded that quartering winds were not the critical case, and came to rely primarily on the calculations for perpendicular winds. Perpendicular winds were the only calculations required by New York City building code. Such winds are normally the worst case, and typically a structural system capable of handling them can easily cope with wind from any other angle.

== Discovery ==
In May 1978, after the building structure was completed, LeMessurier was designing a similar building with wind braces in Pittsburgh, and a potential contractor questioned the expense of using welded rather than bolted joints. LeMessurier asked his office how the welds went at the Citicorp construction and was then told that bolts had been substituted for the welded joints he had prescribed.

In June 1978, Princeton University engineering student Diane Hartley was writing her senior thesis about Citicorp Center's design at the suggestion of her professor, David Billington. As part of that work she analyzed the structural design and calculated stresses from quartering winds, finding them higher than the maximum expected stress values provided to her by LeMessurier's firm. Hartley asked her contact at the building design company, Joel S. Weinstein, a junior member of its staff, about the issue, and he provided her with a copy of the firm's calculations for perpendicular winds (but not for quartering winds). Only Weinstein was indicated as signing off on the copies of the calculations he provided to her, although she expected to see them initialed by a second person to confirm them, as was the usual practice in the industry. According to Hartley, she asked for calculations about quartering winds, and Weinstein said he would provide them but then didn't. Calculations for quartering winds were not required by the building code at the time, and were not common practice in the industry (although the design of the building was obviously unusual and would have justified special analysis). Weinstein assured her that the building could handle the necessary forces, and she did not further pursue the issue beyond writing about it in her thesis, which recorded her concerns and the response she received. In his feedback on Hartley's thesis, Billington questioned the inconsistency of the firm's calculations.

In June 1978, LeMessurier was answering questions via phone with a young architectural student, self-identified more than 40 years later as Lee DeCarolis. On July 24, 1978, LeMessurier went to his office and conducted calculations on Citicorp Center's design. He had thought that perpendicular winds were the critical case for the building rather than quartering winds. He found that, for four of the eight tiers of chevrons, quartering winds would create a 40 percent increase in wind loads and a 160 percent increase in the load at the bolted joints. Citicorp Center's use of bolted joints and the loads from quartering winds would not have caused concern if these issues had been isolated. However, the combination of the two findings prompted LeMessurier to run tests on structural safety. He concluded that the original welded-joint design could withstand the load from both straight-on and quartering winds, but the modified bolted-joint design could be vulnerable to a 70-mile-per-hour (110 km/h) near-hurricane-force quartering wind. LeMessurier also discovered that his firm had used New York City's truss safety factor of 1:1 instead of the column safety factor of 1:2.

On July 26, LeMessurier visited wind-tunnel expert Alan Garnett Davenport at the University of Western Ontario. Davenport's team conducted calculations on the building and concluded not only that LeMessurier's modeling was correct but also that, in a real-world situation, member stresses could increase by more than the 40 percent LeMessurier had calculated. LeMessurier then went to his Maine summer home on July 28 to analyze the issue. With the tuned mass damper active, LeMessurier estimated that a wind capable of toppling the building had a one in fifty-five chance of happening any year. But if the tuned mass damper could not function due to a power outage, a wind strong enough to cause the building's collapse had one in sixteen chance of happening any year.

== Repairs ==
LeMessurier agonized over how to deal with the problem. If the issues were made known to the public, he risked ruining his professional reputation and causing panic in the immediate area surrounding the building and the occupants. LeMessurier considered never bringing the issue up, and he also briefly contemplated committing suicide before anyone else found out about the defect. LeMessurier ultimately contacted Stubbins's lawyer and insurance carrier. LeMessurier then contacted Citicorp's lawyers, the latter of which hired Leslie E. Robertson as an expert adviser. Citicorp accepted LeMessurier's proposal to weld steel plates over the bolted joints, and Karl Koch Erecting was hired for the welding process. Very few people were made aware of the issue, besides Citicorp leadership, mayor Ed Koch, acting buildings commissioner Irving E. Minkin, and the head of the welder's union.

Construction crews started installing the welded panels at night in August 1978. Officials made no public mention of any possible structural issues, and the city's three major newspapers had gone on strike. Officials barely acknowledged the issue, instead describing the work as a routine procedure. Henry DeFord III of Citicorp claimed the Citicorp Center could withstand a 100-year wind and that there were no "noticeable problems in the building at all". As precautions, emergency generators were installed for the mass damper, strain gauges were placed on critical beams and weather forecasters were engaged. Citicorp and local officials created emergency evacuation plans for the immediate neighborhood. However, these evacuation plans were not publicized at the time, although thousands of people could have been killed in a potential collapse. Six weeks into the work, a major storm (Hurricane Ella) was off Cape Hatteras and heading for New York. The reinforcement was only half-finished, with New York City hours away from emergency evacuation, but at that point the backup generators were in place and the mass damper was being continually monitored by special staff, and enough of the bracing had been completed that the tower was estimated to be able to survive a 200-year storm. Ella eventually turned eastward and veered out to sea. The weather watch ended on September 13.

Repairs were completed in October 1978, and most of the newspapers remained out of production for weeks after it was completed. LeMessurier claimed a wind strong enough to topple the repaired building would occur only once every 700 years. Stubbins and LeMessurier's insurance carrier covered all of the repair costs, estimated to be several million dollars.

== Publication ==
Since no structural failure occurred, the work was not publicized until 1995, when a lengthy article appeared in The New Yorker. The 1995 story in The New Yorker described the student as a "young man, whose name has been lost in the swirl of subsequent events" who called LeMessurier saying "that his professor had assigned him to write a paper on the Citicorp tower". However, it was clear that Diane Hartley had never contacted LeMessurier directly – she had spoken only to Joel S. Weinstein. According to one second-hand report, when one of LeMessurier's colleagues asked whether the student was female, "LeMessurier responded that he didn't know because he had not actually spoken with the student." However, in a lecture on the subject, LeMessurier himself said he had spoken directly and repeatedly with the student and referred to the student as male. LeMessurier died in 2007 without describing any communication about the interaction between Hartley and Weinstein.

Hartley identified herself as the probable engineering student in 2011, more than 15 years after the New Yorker article was published. However, another student at a different institution, Lee DeCarolis, identified himself in 2022 as the young man in question. He said he learned in 2011 how he played a part in the Citicorp Building history from reading Einstein's Refrigerator, a 2001 book by the high school teacher and podcaster Steve Silverman. By the time DeCarolis read the book, LeMessurier had died. While DeCarolis had mentioned his role to acquaintances and even written a play about it, he revealed himself to the public at large only after a reassessment by NIST determined that the effect of the wind loads had not been as severe as Hartley and LeMessurier estimated.

The crisis was further detailed in a 2025 book, The Great Miscalculation, by the historian Michael M. Greenburg. In the book, Greenburg wrote that the work had been split up among many individuals, which may have contributed to confusion surrounding the decision to use bolts instead of a welded frame.

== Ethical questions ==
According to a case study by the American Institute of Architects (AIA) Trust, "many have viewed the actions of LeMessurier as nearly heroic, and many engineering schools and ethics educators now use LeMessurier's story as an example of how to act ethically." However, others have criticized LeMessurier for his lack of oversight that led to the issues and his lack of honesty toward neighborhood residents, architects, engineers, and other members of the public when the problems were discovered. Architect Eugene Kremer discussed the ethical questions raised in this case in 2002. Kremer listed six key points that he perceived as ethically objectionable:

1. Analysis of wind loads: Although quartering wind loads were considered early in the design process, LeMessurier initially reached the conclusion that they were not the critical case for the building's structural analysis, and came to rely primarily on the calculations for perpendicular winds, as required by building codes, rather than checking all calculations and scenarios thoroughly.
2. Design changes: The steel framework subcontractor (Bethlehem Steel) proposed to use bolted joints instead of full-penetration welding, and the proposal was approved by LeMessurier's firm without LeMessurier personally reviewing the details. Kremer reported that Robert McNamara, "the managing principal for Citicorp in LeMessurier Associates' Cambridge office", stated that after he reviewed the proposal, he "presented the suggested change to Bill LeMessurier", who "discussed [with him] the technical implications and did calculations as to what effect the bolt extension in the connection would have on the movement of the tower ...", and that LeMessurier's firm then approved the details of the change without LeMessurier personally reviewing those details. This somewhat contradicts LeMessurier, who said he wasn't aware of the substitution until after the work had been completed.
3. Professional responsibility: Before LeMessurier decided to make Citicorp aware of the design defects, he briefly considered concealing the issues instead, or even suicide. Kremer said he should not have entertained such thoughts, even briefly. In contrast, the AIA study reports that it is clear LeMessurier never really considered the other options seriously.
4. Public statements: In press interviews and releases of information at the time, officials either omitted or lied about details of the defects. Kremer cites the National Society of Professional Engineers (NSPE) Code of Ethics, which says engineers shall "Issue public statements only in an objective and truthful manner."
5. Public safety: When Hurricane Ella threatened the city in August and September 1978, evacuation plans for the surrounding area were made in secret. Kremer cites the NSPE Board of Ethical Review (BER), which, although it was not commenting about the Citicorp Center specifically, said "withholding critical information from thousands of individuals whose safety is compromised over a significant period of time" is improper (although it could be argued that the Citicorp Center situation did not rise to meet that standard, when considering that no storms with high winds actually occurred in New York City during the period in question, and other steps had been taken to reduce the risk, and evacuation plans were ready if a high-wind storm were to occur).
6. Advancing professional knowledge: Kremer argues that concealing the crisis for almost 20 years prevented some of the ethical and engineering analysis and learning that could have taken place if information had been released about the Citicorp Center case.

== Sources ==
- Morgenstern, Joseph (May 25, 1995). "The Fifty-Nine-Story Crisis". The New Yorker. pp. 45–53. (accessible only once without a subscription)
- Postal, Matthew A. (December 6, 2016). "Citicorp Center" (PDF). New York City Landmarks Preservation Commission.
- Stern, Robert A. M.; Mellins, Thomas; Fishman, David (1995). New York 1960: Architecture and Urbanism Between the Second World War and the Bicentennial (1960 ed.). New York: Monacelli Press. ISBN 1-885254-02-4.
