= Hugh Stubbins =

American architect (1912–2006)

- Born: Hugh Asher Stubbins Jr. 11 January 1912; Birmingham, Alabama, U.S.
- Died: 5 July 2006 (aged 94); Cambridge, Massachusetts, U.S.
- Education: Georgia Institute of Technology, Harvard University
- Occupation: Architect
- Practice: Hugh Stubbins and Associates; The Stubbins Associates; KlingStubbins
- Buildings: Citigroup Center in New York

Hugh Asher Stubbins Jr. (January 11, 1912 – July 5, 2006) was an American architect who designed several high-profile buildings around the world.

== Biography ==
Hugh Stubbins was born in Birmingham, Alabama, and attended the Georgia Institute of Technology before earning his master's degree from Harvard University's Graduate School of Design, where he studied with Walter Gropius, a founder of the Bauhaus movement in Germany. Stubbins remained on the faculty at Harvard until 1972.

He formed his own practice in 1949, which grew to become Hugh Stubbins and Associates in 1972. Its successor company, The Stubbins Associates, merged with Philadelphia-based Kling in 2007 to form KlingStubbins. The New York Times called his 1977 Citicorp Center "by any standard ... one of New York's significant buildings."

Stubbins died of pneumonia at age 94, on July 5, 2006, at Mount Auburn Hospital in Cambridge, Massachusetts.

== Recognition ==
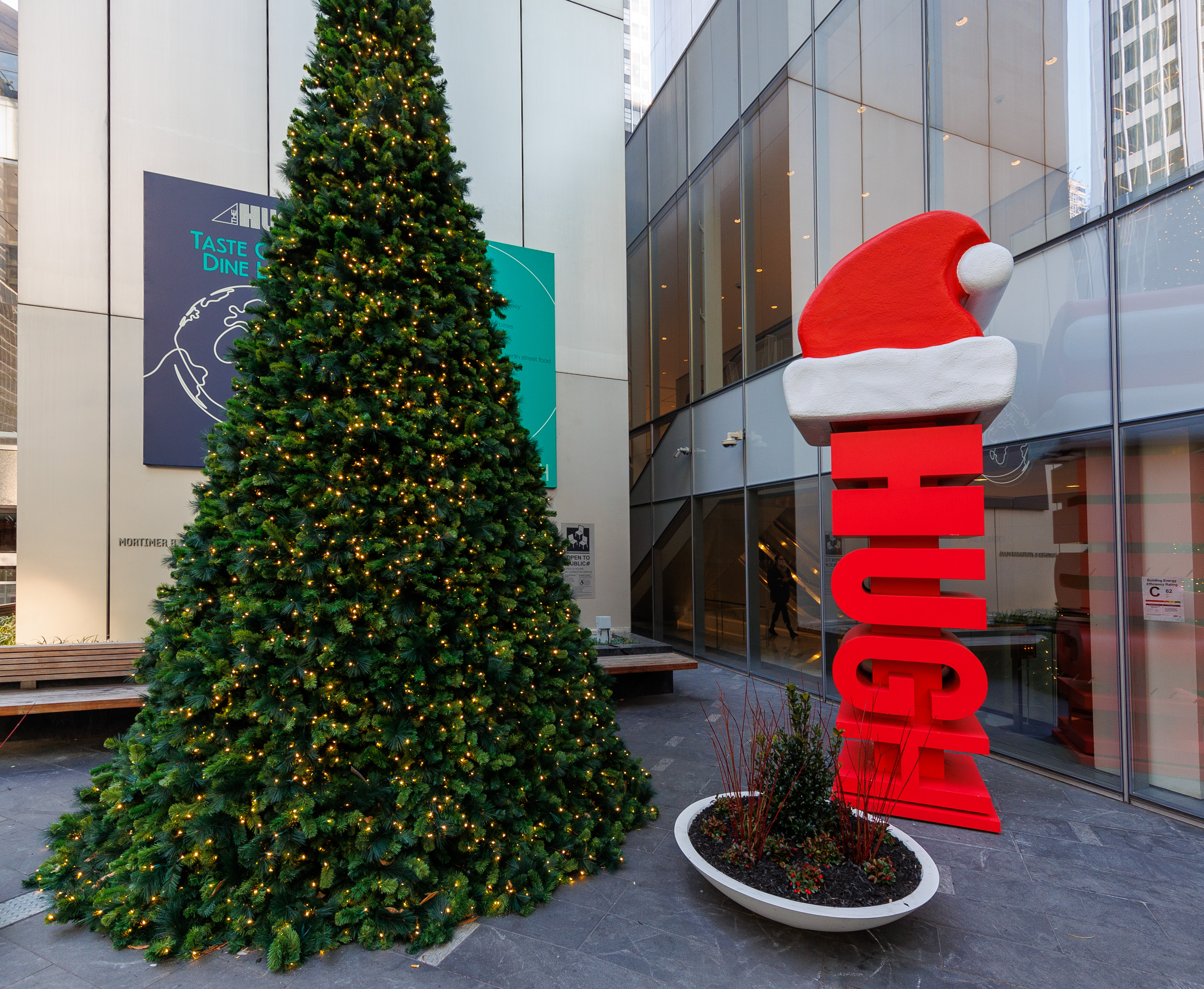
The food court at Citigroup Center is named for Stubbins

In 2021, a spacious food hall named after Stubbins opened on the ground floor of Citigroup Center. The food court, named simply The Hugh, features 17 restaurants, bars, and food vendors.

== Works ==
Selected works (chronologically)

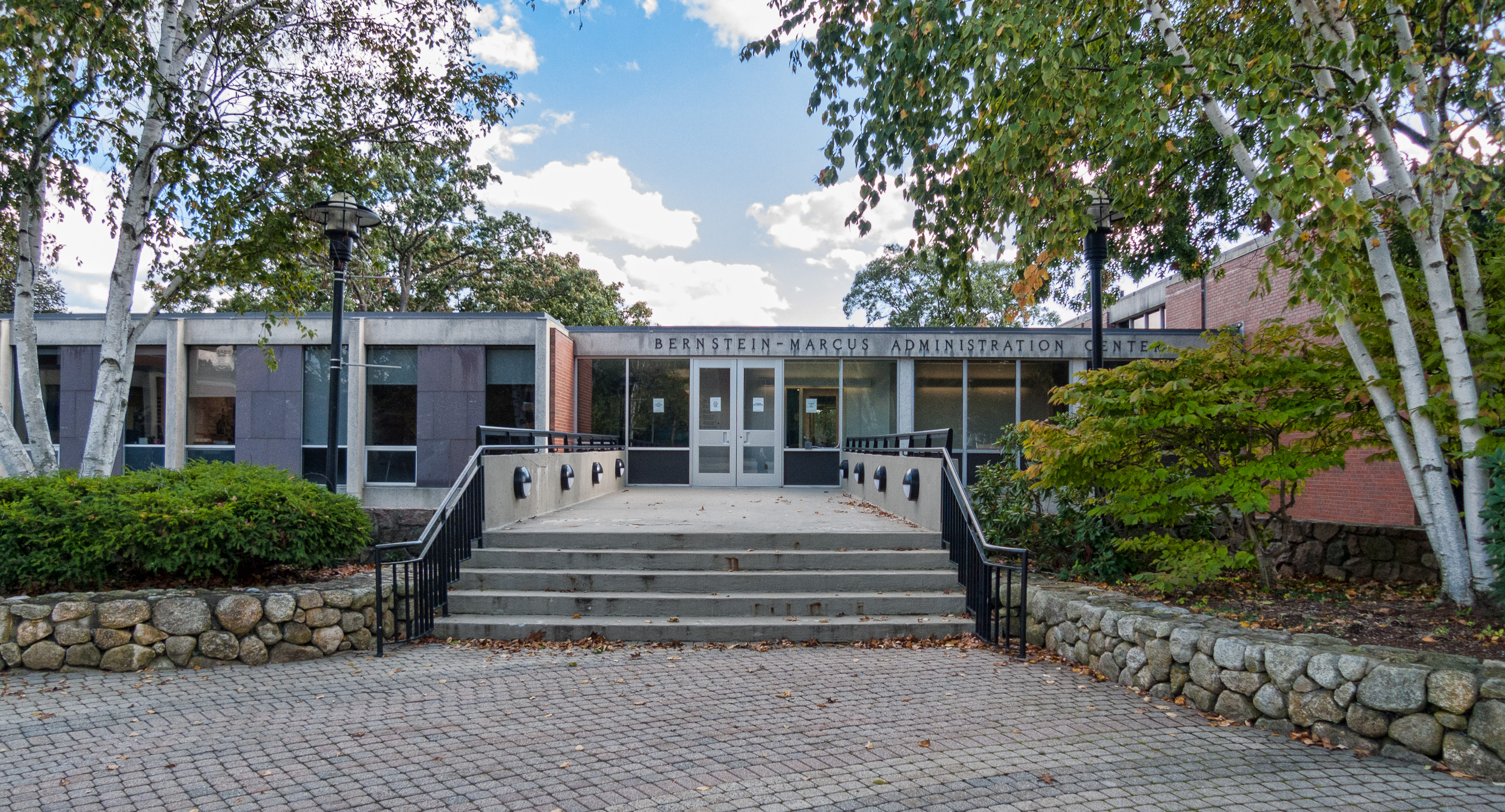
Bernstein-Marcus Administration Center, Brandeis University (1959)

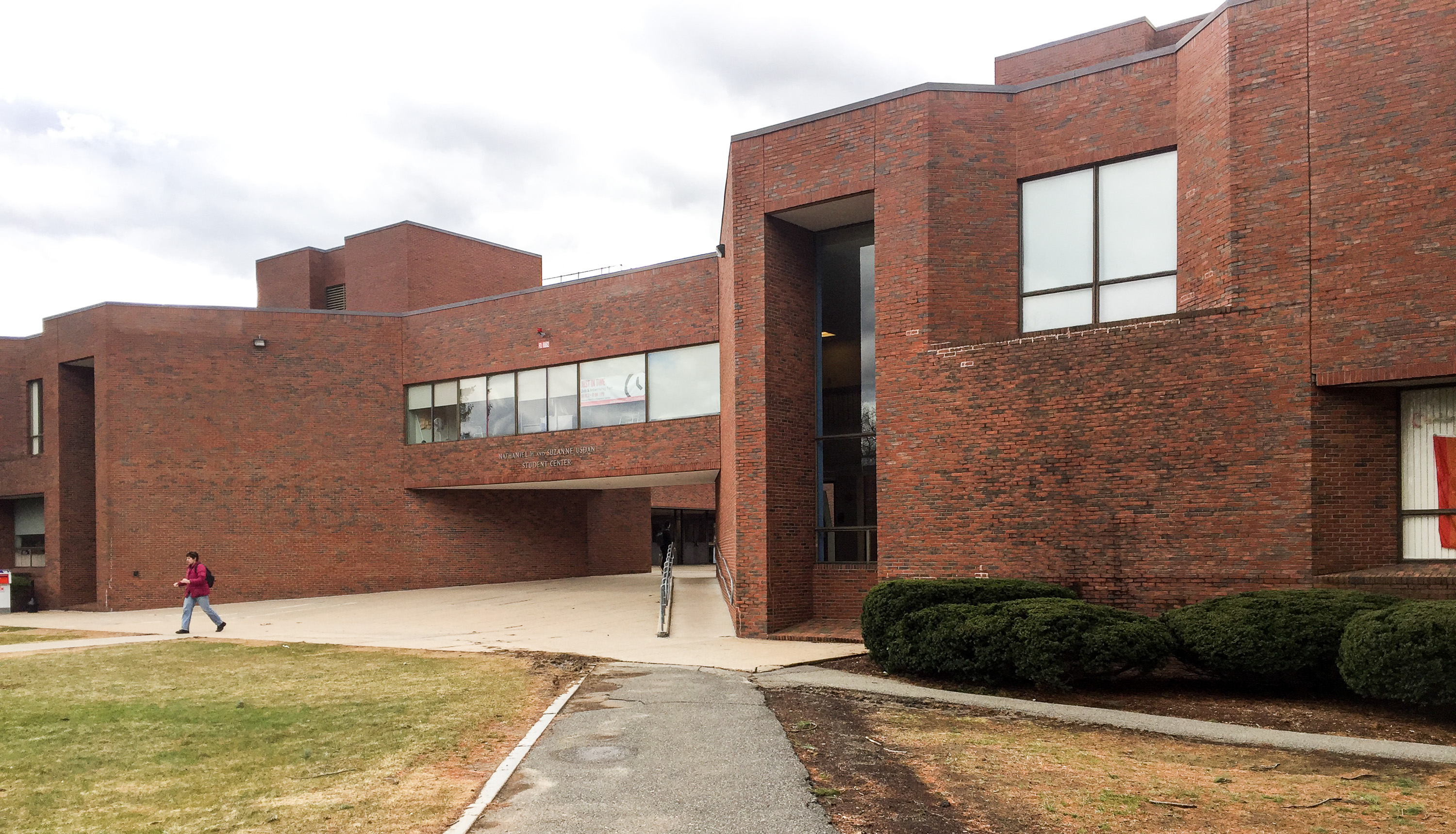
Usdan Student Center, Brandeis University (1970)

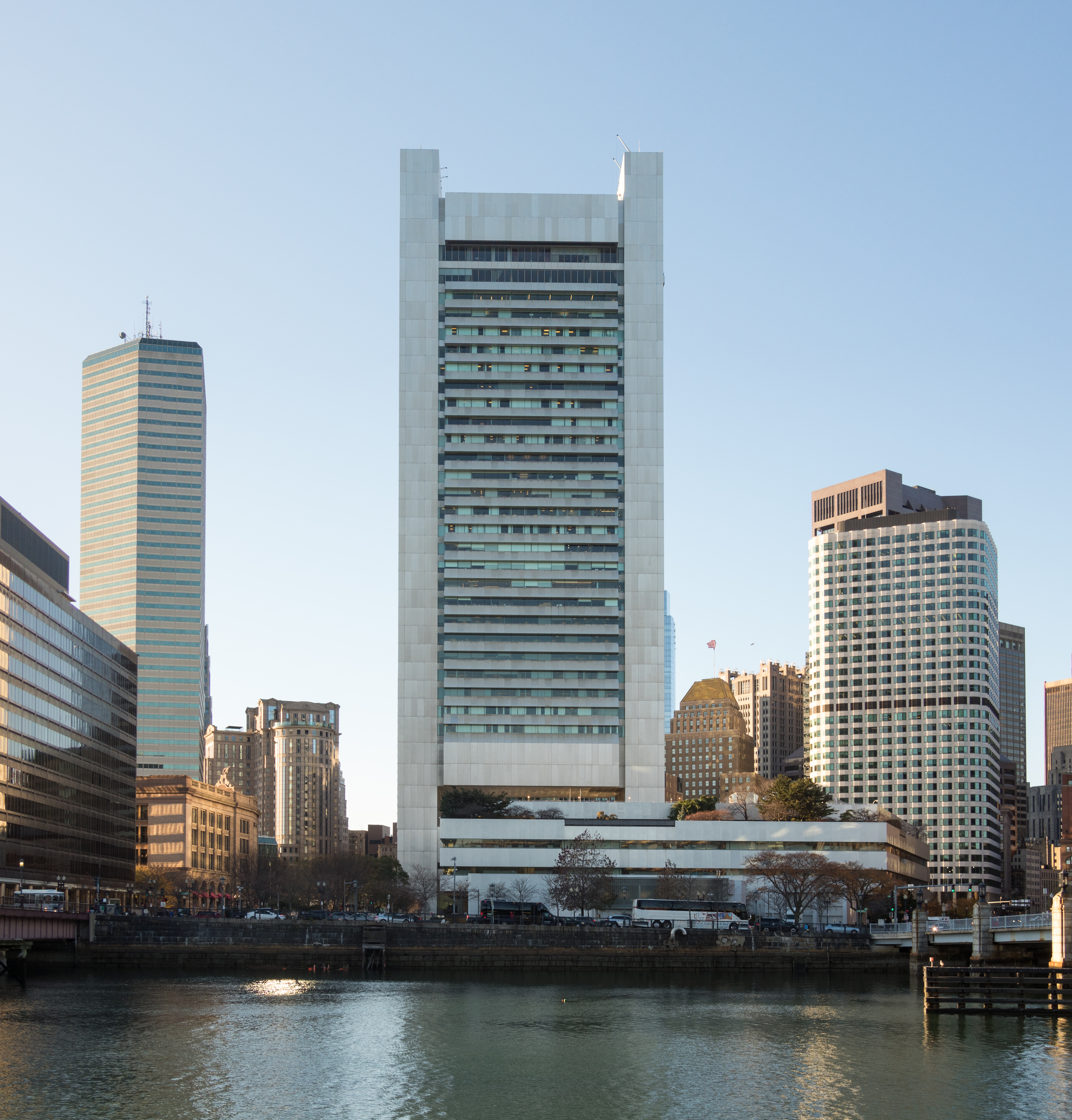
Federal Reserve Bank Building, Boston (1977)

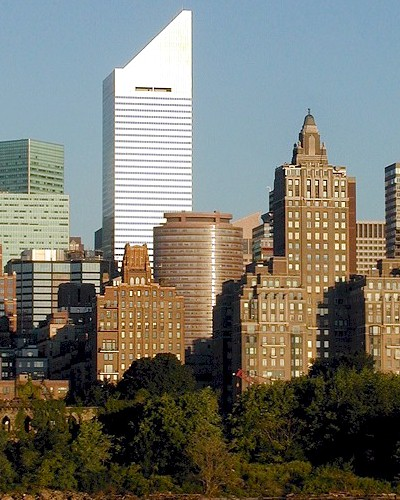
Citigroup Center in New York (1977)

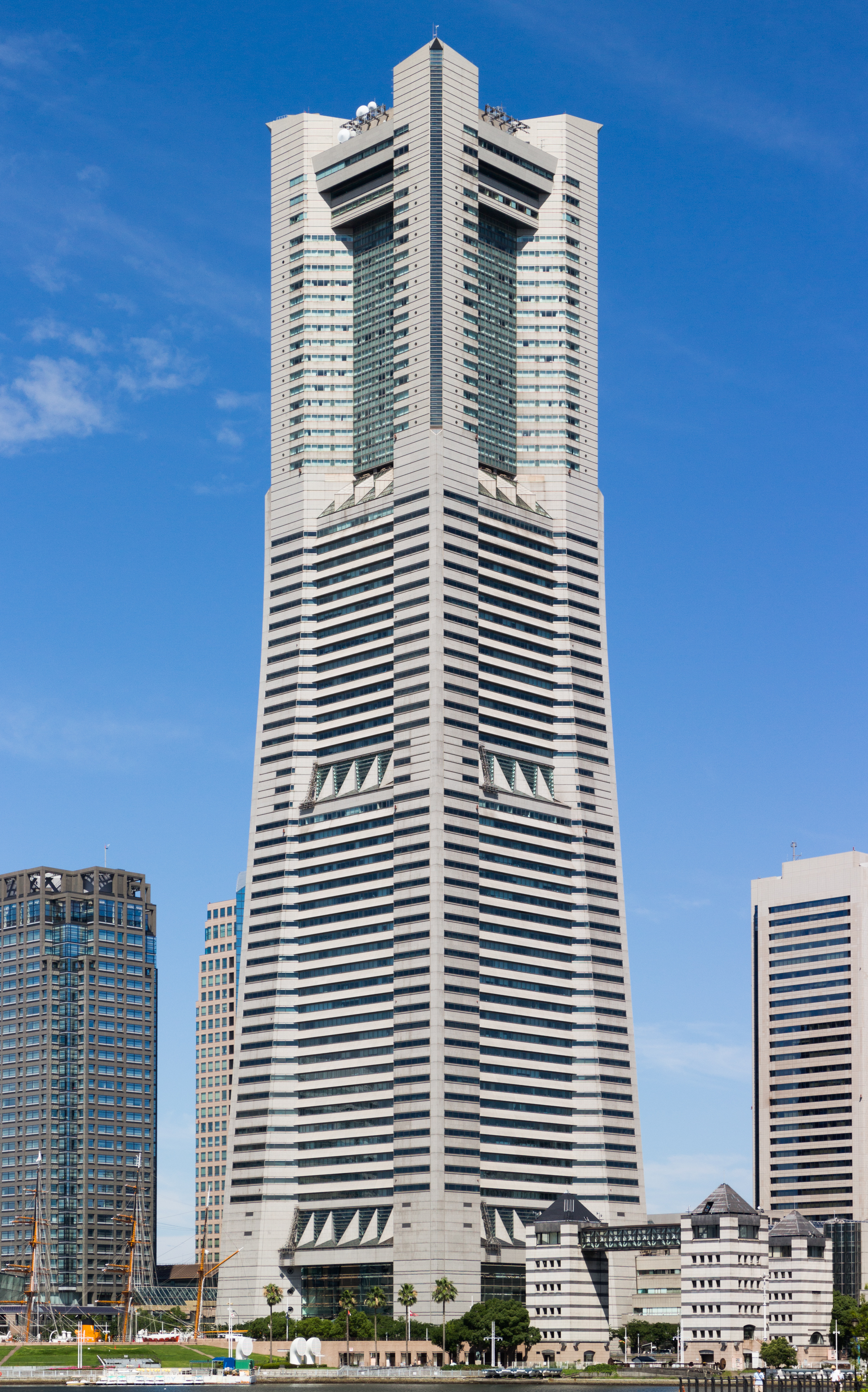
Yokohama Landmark Tower (1993)

Among the buildings he designed:

- 1946 Stubbins family home, Lexington, Massachusetts
- 1957 Kongresshalle, Berlin, Germany
- 1952–1953 Lantern Hill Subdivision in East Lansing, Michigan
- 1959 Administrative buildings at Brandeis University, Waltham, Massachusetts: Irving Presidential Enclave, Gryzmish Academic Center, and Bernstein-Marcus Administration Center
- 1960 Loeb Drama Center, Harvard University
- 1960 Norman and Marion Perry House, Campton, New Hampshire
- 1964 The New New Quad, later known as Butler College, Princeton University (demolished)
- 1964 Coles Tower at Bowdoin College, Brunswick, Maine
- 1965 Francis A. Countway Library of Medicine, Harvard Medical School
- 1966 Southwest Residential Area at University of Massachusetts Amherst
- 1968 The Hotchkiss School, Main Building
- 1968 Forsyth Wickes Addition, Museum of Fine Arts, Boston
- 1968 Jadwin Physics Building, Princeton University
- 1968–1971 Johnson Library Center, Cole Science Center, Franklin Patterson Hall and Dormitories at Hampshire College
- 1970 Usdan Student Center, Brandeis University
- 1970 George Robert White Wing, Museum of Fine Arts, Boston
- 1971 Veterans Stadium in Philadelphia (demolished 2004)
- 1972 Daniel Burke Library at Hamilton College, Clinton, New York
- 1973 Pusey Library, at 27 Harvard Yard, Harvard University, Cambridge, MA
- 1976 Federal Reserve Bank building, Boston, MA
- 1976 Seeley G. Mudd Manuscript Library at Princeton University
- 1977 Citigroup Center in New York
- 1971 College Five, renamed Porter College, University of California Santa Cruz
- 1983 One Cleveland Center in Cleveland
- 1984 PacWest Center in Portland, Oregon
- 1986 Treasury Building, Singapore
- 1988 Fifth Avenue Place, Pittsburgh, Pennsylvania
- 1988 Nashville City Center, Nashville, Tennessee
- 1990 Salesforce Tower, Indianapolis, Indiana
- 1991 Ronald Reagan Presidential Library in Simi Valley, California
- 1993 Yokohama Landmark Tower in Japan

== See also ==
- Citicorp Center engineering crisis
