= Norman and Marion Perry House =

Historic house in New Hampshire, United States

- U.S. National Register of Historic Places
- NH State Register of Historic Places
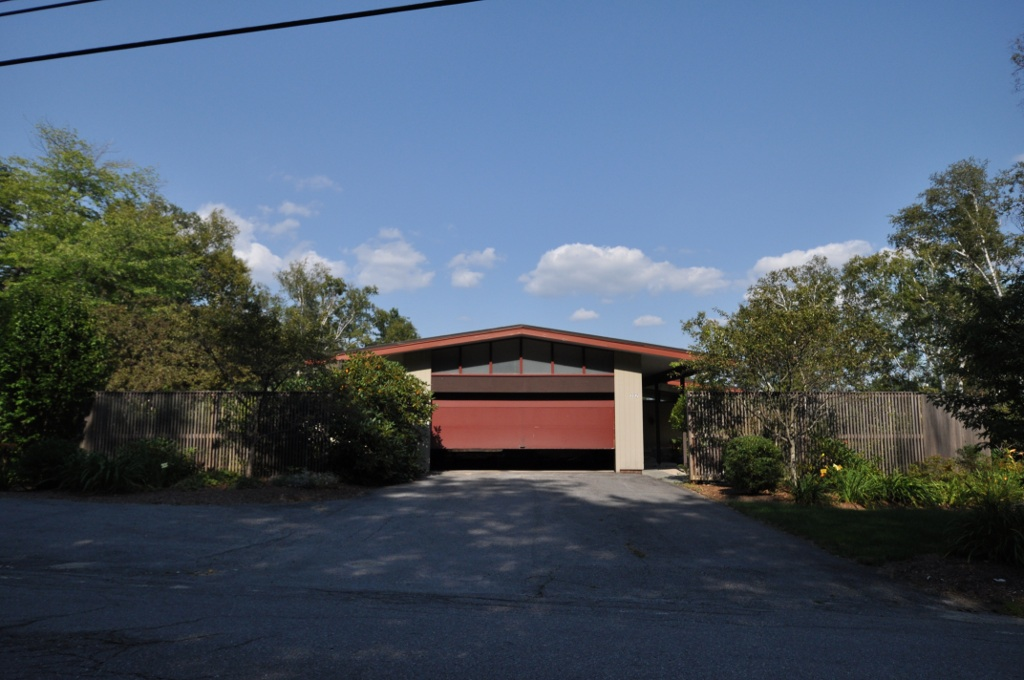

- Location within New Hampshire Location within the United States
- Location: 352 Ellsworth Hill Rd., Campton, NH
- Coordinates: 43°51′18″N 71°41′46″W
- Architect: Hugh Stubbins
- Architectural style: Modern
- NRHP reference No.: 12000821

Significant dates
- Added to NRHP: September 25, 2012
- Designated NHSRHP: October 29, 2007

The Norman and Marion Perry House is a historic house at 352 Ellsworth Hill Road in Campton, New Hampshire. The house was built in 1960 to a design by Hugh Stubbins, and is a residential embodiment of Modernist architecture. The property was landscaped by Leon Pearson, and has views of the surrounding mountain landscape. The house is currently a privately owned residence.

The house was listed on the National Register of Historic Places in 2012, and the New Hampshire State Register of Historic Places in 2011.

== See also ==
- National Register of Historic Places listings in Grafton County, New Hampshire
