= Prix Albert Caquot =

The Prix Albert Caquot is an annual prestigious award presented by the French Association of Civil Engineering. It is named after Albert Caquot, a famous and influential French civil engineer. The award is given for a lifetime of scientific and technical achievements, as well as high ethical standards and influence throughout the construction industry. It alternates between French and foreign nominees.

== Award winners ==
- 1989 Fritz Leonhardt
- 1990 Pierre Xercavins
- 1991 Franco Levi
- 1992 Henri Mathieu
- 1993 Bruno Thürlimann
- 1994 Roger Lacroix, Jean-Claude Foucriat
- 1995 Tung-Yen Lin
- 1996 Jean M. Muller
- 1997 René Walther
- 1998 Jacques Bietry
- 1999 Jörg Schlaich
- 2000 Pierre Richard, Inventor of Béton de Poudre Réactive (BPR)
- 2001 Alan Garnett Davenport
- 2002 Jacques Mathivat
- 2003 John E. Breen
- 2004 Jacques Brozzetti
- 2005 Jan Moksnes
- 2006 Michel Virlogeux
- 2007 José Câncio Martins
- 2008 Michel Lévy
- 2009 Jean-Marie Cremer
- 2010 Jean-Armand Calgaro
- 2011 Manfred A. Hirt
- 2012 Michel Placidi
- 2013 Jiří Stráský
- 2014 Jacques Combault,
- 2015 Armando Rito
- 2016 Alain Pecker
