= August Riedinger =

German businessman, gasworks and airships

- Born: October 9, 1845
- Died: January 15, 1919 (aged 73)
- Occupation: Businessman

August Riedinger (9 October 1845 – 15 January 1919) was a German businessman who operated gas companies in Germany and Europe and also participated in balloon and airship manufacturing.

== Life ==
Riedinger was born in 1845 as the son of the industrialist Ludwig August Riedinger in Augsburg. After six years of studies at the Zurich Polytechnic he entered his father's machinery and bronzeworks business in 1877.

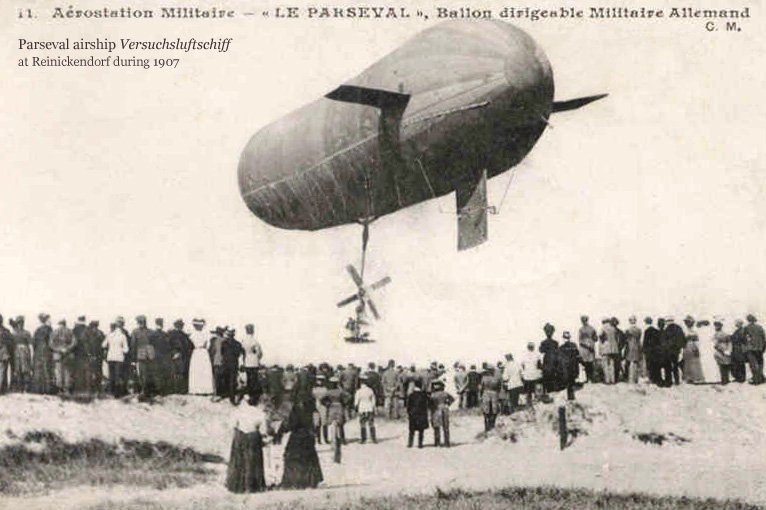
Parseval-Versuchsluftschiff

His father died in 1879 when the business had 25 gasworks in Bavaria, and another 42 in the rest of Europe and a number of gas plants for factories and public buildings. In 1883 Riedinger took over the business and in 1887 when the company converted to the Joint stock company L. A. Riedinger Maschinen- und Bronzewarenfabrik AG, he became a member of its supervisory board. By then he had already founded the AG Vereinigte Gaswerke (AG United Gasworks) in Augsburg which by 1896 had grown to 17 gas work companies, for example in Bolzano, Lugano and Marburg.

He also worked in the executive committee of the German gas industry association (Gesellschaft für Gasindustrie). In 1889 he took part in the construction and operation of the Localbahn Innsbruck–Hall in Tirol. (a local railway).

From 1888 Riedinger began working with August von Parseval and Hans Bartsch von Sigsfeld on the development of dirigible airships. Due to the high development costs he auctioned off his museum collection in 1894. In 1897 he founded the Ballonfabrik Augsburg, which until the end of World War I produced about 4,000 unmanned military kite balloons (hydrogen filled balloons shaped to act as a kite)., vast majority of those Parseval-Sigsfeld type.

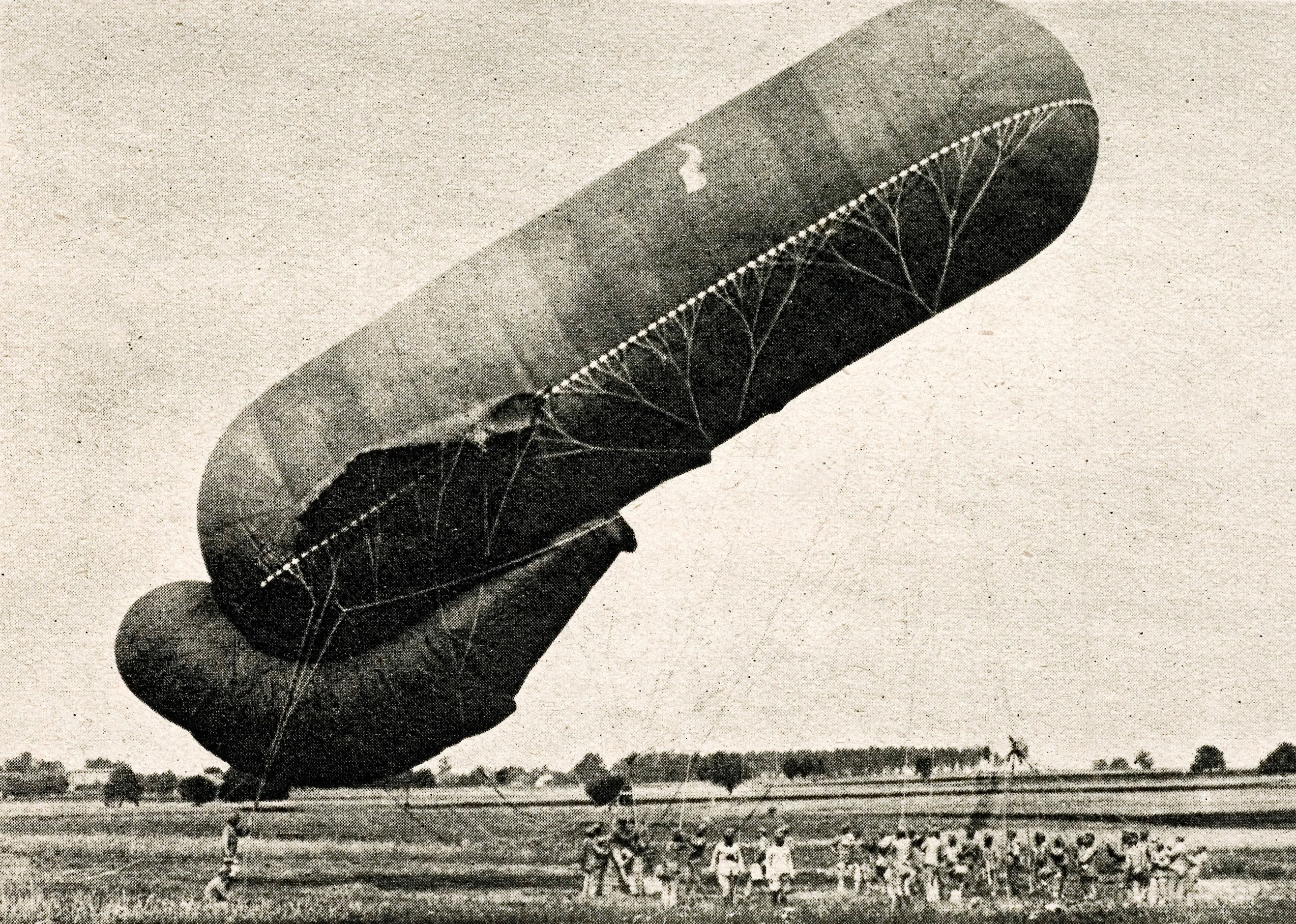
Parseval-Sigsfeld kite balloon

In 1906 at the Ballonfabrik the first of the Parseval airships was built, the Versuchluftschiff. Later in 1931 from the same Ballonfabrik's launch site Auguste Piccard made the first ascent into the Stratosphere.

In 1910 Riedinger founded a company to manufacture Blau gas, a fuel gas produced from Petroleum, named after its inventor Hermann Blau. Blau gas was burned for lighting and heating; and later also used as fuel for the LZ 127 Graf Zeppelin.

In 1908 Riedinger was appointed as the Königlich Bayerischen Kommerzienrat and in 1912 became a committee member of the Association of the Deutsches Museum. He was also known for encouraging technical progress and as a patron of the arts.

August Riedinger was married twice. His first wife Anna (1848–1882) was Max von Pettenkofer's daughter. After Anna's early death he married Bertha Brandenberger in 1883, the daughter of the technical director of the Augsburg Baumwollspinnerei am Stadtbach (a cotton spinning mill). With each wife he had one son and one daughter.
