= Avorio-Prassone kite balloon =

Italian-made observation balloon type

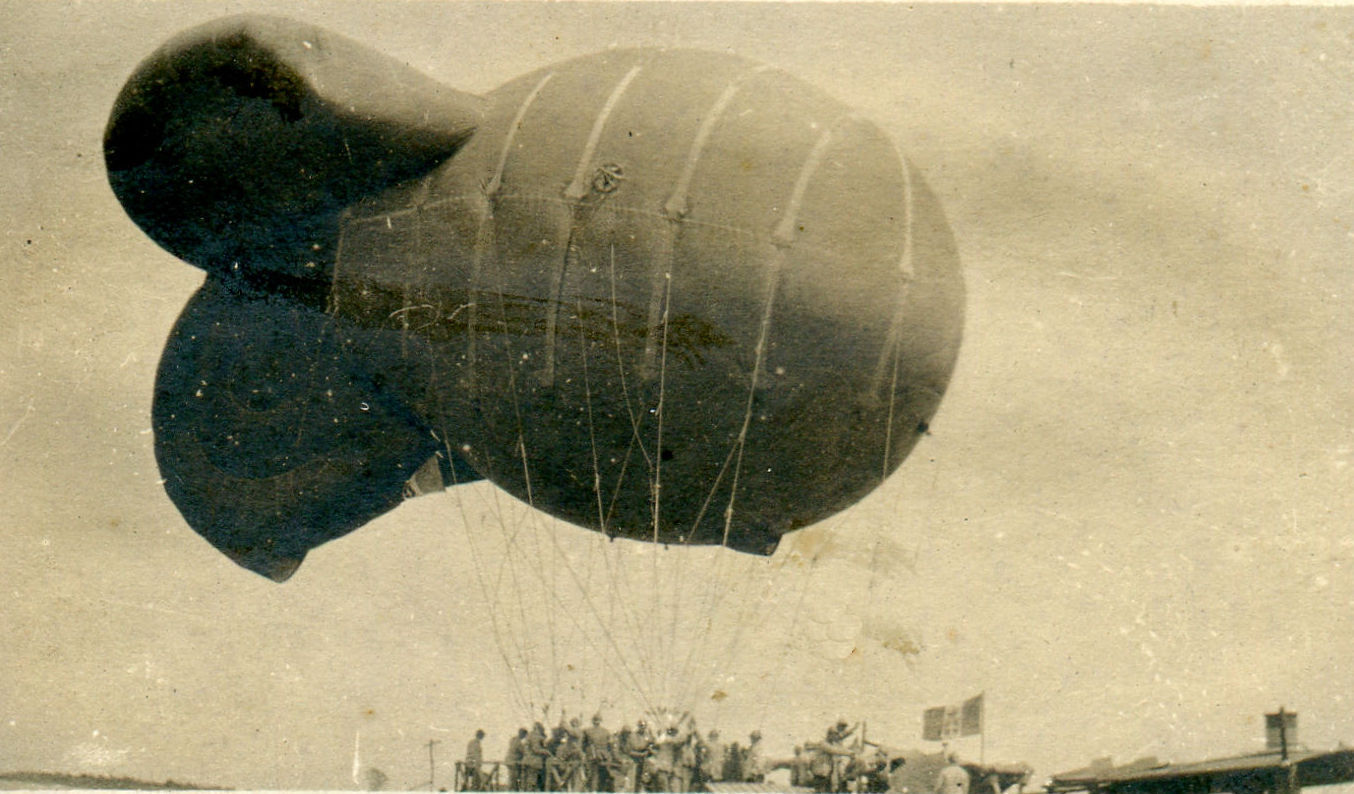
- Avorio-Prassone balloon

General information
- Type: Observation balloon
- National origin: Italy
- Manufacturer: Stabilimento costruzioni aeronautiche militari, Rome
- Designer: Luigi Avorio, Eugenio Prassone
- Primary user: Royal Italian Army

History
- First flight: 1915

Avorio-Prassone kite balloon (in French Avorio-Prassone Captif) was a type of non-rigid military observation balloon, designed in 1915 by Luigi Avorio and Eugenio Prassone. The type entered into service in the Royal Italian Army and became the main domestic type of observation balloon during World War I.

== Design ==
Project of Italian kite balloon type was assigned to Major Luigi Avorio, Chief of the Aeronautical Division of the Italian Army, and Dr. Eugenio Prassone, director of the Stabilimento costruzioni aeronautiche militari aircraft factory in Rome. The first prototype was finished in 1915, series production followed soon after. By its design the type followed the shapes of French Caquot kite balloon being more spherical, although it was still able to generate some aerodynamic lift and like the Caquot, had three fins for stability balance.

== Operational history ==
At the beginning of the war Avorio-Prassones were used exclusively by the Italian army, for example as anti-aircraft defence tools in Venice and other Italian cities. Some units were also produced in the United Kingdom under the license and at the end of the war used as a barrage balloons in London area.

On 12 August 1918 Avoria and Prassone received an U. S. patent for their balloon unit. In the same month the U. S. Navy brought two of the units and put them under the tests in the military balloon school in Fort Omaha, Nebraska. At least thee other units were manufactured in Connecticut Aircraft Comp. factory in 1920 for the U. S. Navy. In 1930 U. S. military forces owned eight of Avorio-Prassone units.

== Specifications ==
General characteristics

- Length: 1,223 m (4,012 ft 6 in)
- Diameter: 350 m (1,150 ft)

Performance Armament
none

== See also ==
- Kite balloon
- Caquot kite balloon

== Bibliography ==
- Ege, Lennart (1973). Balloons and Airships 1783–1973. Blandford Colour series - The Pocket Encyclopaedia of World Aircraft in Colour. Translated by Hildesheim, Erik. London: Blandfor Press. pp. 168–169. ISBN 0-7137-0568-X.
- Murphy, Justin D. (April 27, 2005). Military Aircraft, Origins to 1918: An Illustrated History of Their Impact. ABC-CLIO. p. 49. ISBN 1851094881.
