= Alan Garnett Davenport =

- Born: September 19, 1932; Madras, India
- Died: July 19, 2009 (aged 76); London, Ontario, Canada
- Citizenship: Canadian
- Spouse: Sheila Smith
- Engineering career
- Discipline: Civil engineering Wind engineering

Alan Garnett Davenport (September 19, 1932 – July 19, 2009) was a professor at the University of Western Ontario and founder of its Boundary Layer Wind Tunnel Laboratory. He analyzed the wind's effect on a significant portion of the world's tallest buildings including the CN Tower and the buildings formerly known as the Sears Tower, Citicorp Center, and the World Trade Center. He was a Member of the Order of Canada, Canada's highest civilian honor.

He is considered one of the fathers of Wind engineering.

== Early life ==
Davenport was born in Madras, India and grew up in South Africa, attending Michaelhouse. He studied at Cambridge University for his B.A. and M.A. in mechanical science. He went on to receive an M.A.Sc. from the University of Toronto and a Ph.D. from the University of Bristol. His thesis of "The Treatment of Wind Loads on Tall Towers and Long Span Bridges in the Turbulent Wind" was the focus of his professional career.

He also served as a pilot in the Royal Canadian Navy.

He married Sheila Smith, with whom he had four children.

== Research ==
Davenport and his laboratory contributed to the engineering and design of many tall buildings and bridges, including the Willis Tower, the World Trade Center and the Tsing Ma Bridge. They analyzed the wind flow and load over the structures using wind tunnels, detecting vulnerabilities which required compensating changes in the design.

He was a founding editor of the Canadian Journal of Civil Engineering and was the founding research director for the Institute of Catastrophic Loss Reduction, a 1999 partnership between the University of Western Ontario and the Insurance board of Canada. Its goal is to improve construction practices and standards to better withstand extreme weather conditions.

Davenport authored more than 200 scientific papers during his career.

He was presented with the Gerhard Herzberg Canada Gold Medal for Science and Engineering in 1994, and the Albert Caquot Award in 2001. He was appointed a Member of the Order of Canada on May 1, 2002 for a lifetime of achievement.

He was honored with the Lynn S. Beedle Lifetime Achievement Award from the Council on Tall Buildings and Urban Habitat in 2005.

== Retirement ==
He died in London, Ontario due to complications from Parkinson's disease
