= August von Parseval =

German airship designer (1861–1942)

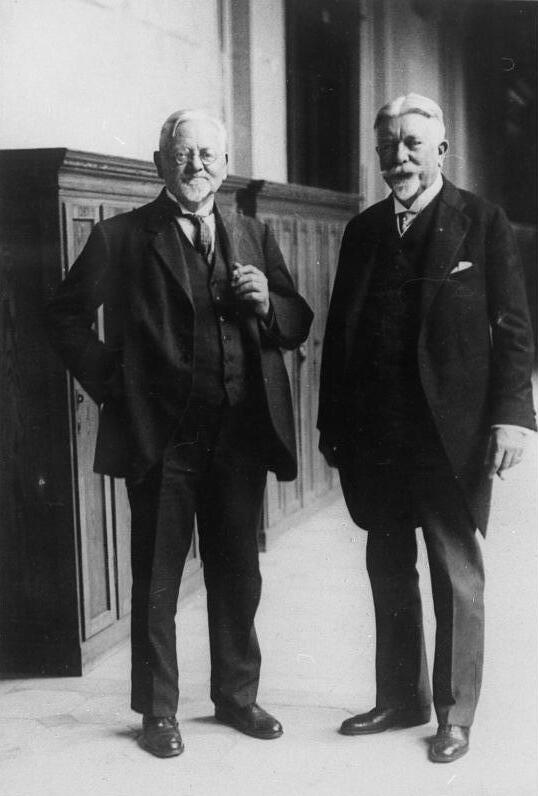
- Parseval (left) and Johann Schütte (right) in November 1929
- Born: 5 February 1861; Frankenthal, Kingdom of Bavaria
- Died: 22 February 1942 (aged 81); Berlin, Germany
- Occupation: Airship designer

August von Parseval (5 February 1861, in Frankenthal (Pfalz) – 22 February 1942, in Berlin) was a German airship designer. His designs for an amphibian flying boat, balanced by two wing-floats, achieved liftoff in April 1910. This marked the beginning of marine aviation in Germany. He became a professor at the Technische Hochschule in Charlottenburg.

As a boy, Parseval attended the Royal Bavarian Pagenkorps in Munich from 1873 to 1878, where he took the Fähnrichexamen (cadet exams). He then joined the Royal Bavarian 3rd Infantry Regiment Prinz Carl von Bayern. An autodidact, he busied himself with the problems of aeronautics. In the garrison town of Augsburg he came into contact with August Riedinger and also came to know his later partner Hans Bartsch von Sigsfeld, with whom he developed Drachenballons: kite balloons used by the military for observation designated as Parseval-Sigsfeld type.

In 1901 Parseval and Sigsfeld began building a dirigible airship. After Sigsfeld's death during a free balloon landing in 1902, the work was interrupted until 1905.

By 1905, thanks to improvements in motor design, an appropriate engine was now available. His designs were licensed to the British Vickers company. In 1907, Parseval retired from the Germany army to devote his time entirely to scientific works. His partner von Sigsfeld had died in 1906.

Up to the end of the First World War, 22 Parseval airships (both non-rigid (blimps) and semi-rigid (with keels) were built. In the late twenties and early thirties, four more semi-rigid airships were built in accordance with the "Parseval-Naatz principle". Because the Parseval ships were non-rigid, unlike Zepplins, they were sold freely to foreign powers, including: Austria, Russia, Turkey, Japan, Italy, and Great Britain.

Parseval is sometimes written Parzeval or Parceval, particularly in historical documents.

The flights of each 'Parseval', like those of the Zeppelins, excited great interest. In Kiel, a tavern closed in 2002 which had been named Zum Parseval upon the first visit of one of these airships in 1912.

== See also ==
- Parseval airships
