= Kite balloon =

Type of tethered balloon

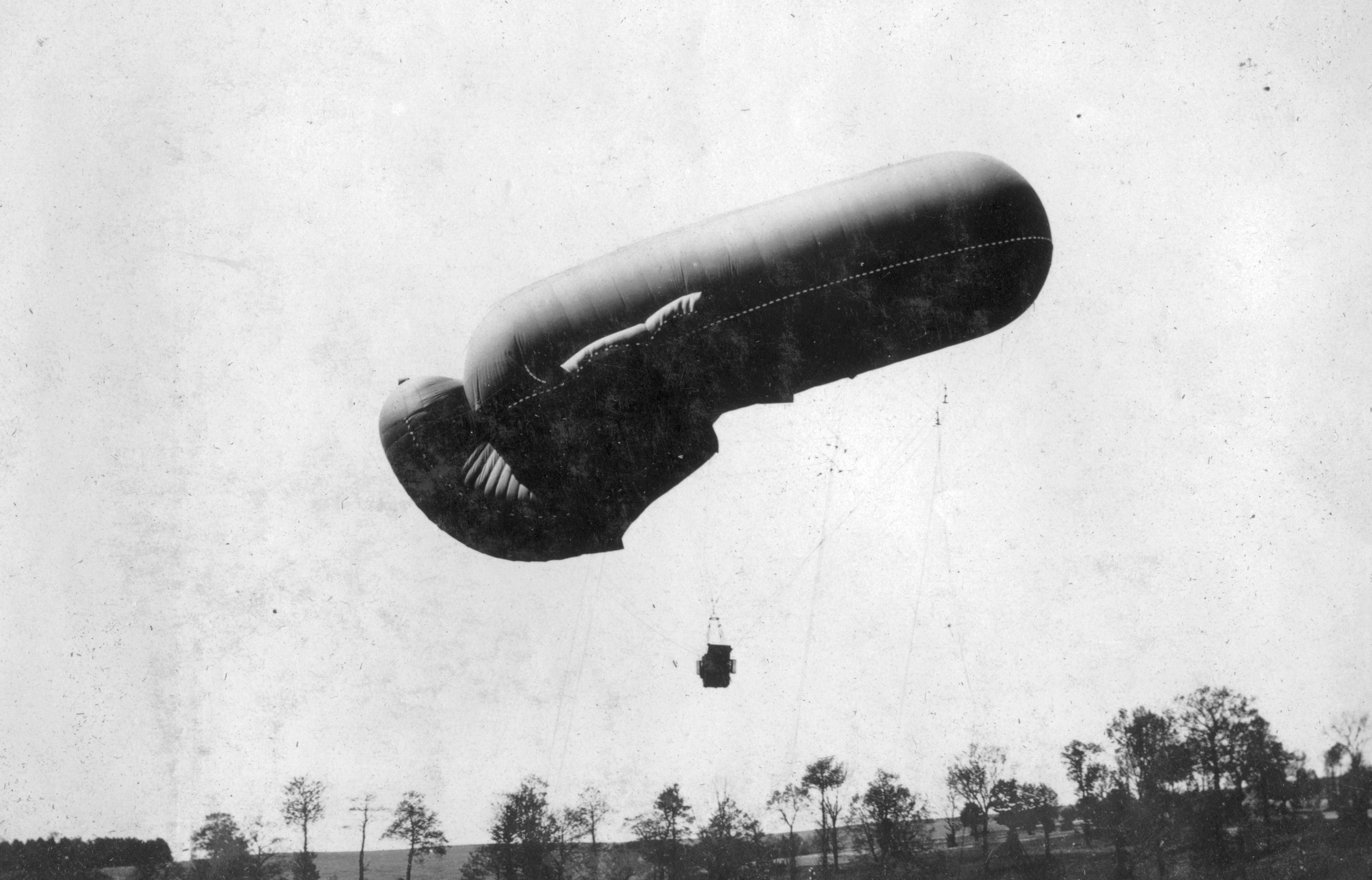
Drachen kite balloon, showing its characteristic shape

A kite balloon is a tethered balloon which is shaped to help make it stable in low and moderate winds and to increase its lift. It typically comprises a streamlined envelope with stabilising features and a harness or yoke connecting it to the main tether and a second harness connected to an observer's basket.

Kite balloons are able to fly in higher winds than ordinary round balloons which tended to bob and spin in windy conditions. They were extensively used for military observation during World War I and similar designs were used for anti-aircraft barriers, as barrage balloons in both world wars.

== Design and development ==
Developed in Germany from 1893 by Parseval and Sigsfeld (de:Hans Bartsch von Sigsfeld), the main component of their kite balloon is its tubular-shaped envelope, similar to that of a non-rigid airship, giving it its British and French nicknames of "sausage". This was inclined at a nose up angle to about 30–40° from the horizontal, which resulted in it producing some aerodynamic lift to augment the lift from the hydrogen used and which helped reduce the up and down pitching common with spherical balloons.

As with a blimp, the envelope was also the main lifting gas bag. Later versions of the Drachen used wind pressure to inflate a stabilising ballonets or sock at the rear, which acted as a tail fin and kept it pointed into the wind. A yoke or harness connected the balloon to the tether and was arranged to aid stability. Early versions of the Parseval had fixed fins, which were later replaced with the sock mounted on the underside that was inflated by the wind. The Parseval's perceived resemblance to an erect phallus led to the nickname in German service of Die Freude der Mädchen (Maiden's joy). Sizes of early examples varied but two main sizes became common – 600 and 1,200 m (2,000 and 3,900 ft) and mass production was carried out at the August Riedinger Balloon Plant in Augsburg, Germany. The observer was given a parachute, attached to the outside of the basket and while the winch was pulling the balloon down, he would jump.

Parseval balloons most often operated at an altitudes between 1,000 and 2,000 m (3,300 and 6,600 ft), could handle winds of up to 65 km/h (40 mph) and were equipped with an engine-driven winch to lower them quickly in the event of an attack. To further dissuade attacks, they were often ringed with anti-aircraft batteries, making attacks on them extremely hazardous. Despite this, they were the target of frequent attacks.

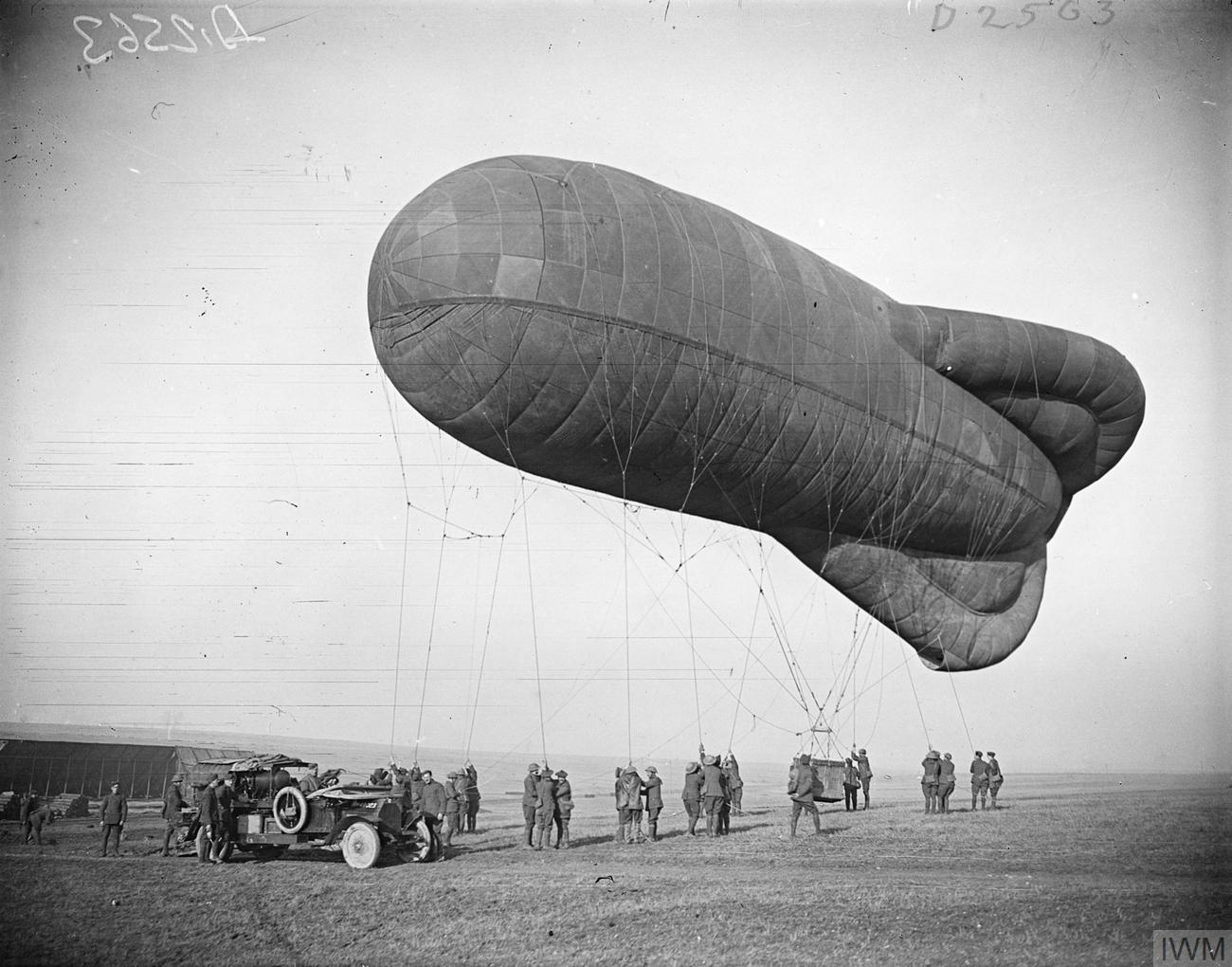
Caquot kite balloon with basket near the ground

Initially the French and British used copies of the German Parseval Drachen balloons but the French captain Albert Caquot, for whom it was named, developed a much-improved design that replaced the tubular sausage shaped envelope with a more aerodynamic teardrop shape and replaced the sock with three fins, which were also held rigid by the wind blowing past it. Six versions of the Caquot (L, M, M.2, P, P.2 and R) saw widespread use, in four main sizes, 750, 800, 930 and 1,000 m^{3} (26,000, 28,000, 33,000 and 35,000 cu ft). The 750 m^{3} (26,000 cu ft) type P could carry two observers to 500 m (1,600 ft), while the 1,000 m^{3} (35,000 cu ft) type R could carry 3 to 500 m (1,600 ft) or 2 to 1,000 m (3,300 ft).

Like the Parseval, the Caquot could be hauled down in an emergency, at speeds up to 6 m/s (20 ft/s). Until 1916 a Saconney type winch was used, powered with a Delahaye motor of either 32 or 60 hp (24 or 45 kW) but from 1917, a winch of their own design was used, powered with a 70 hp (52 kW) de Dion-Bouton motor.

The kite balloon had a parachute in a flat container attached to the observation basket. The observer wore a harness around his waist, attached by lines to the parachute. If the balloonist jumped, the parachute was pulled from the container.

For shipboard use by the US Navy, the observer boarded the basket each morning just before daylight and would clip the boarding line to his parachute harness. They tried to make the hoist during a calm period, as the balloon could behave erratically in turbulence, so the observation basket might be dunked before the tether was extended enough to allow the kite balloon to go aloft. Wet or dry, the balloon observer spent the whole day aloft. Its appearance earned it the nickname rubber cow.

The Italian military also developed a kite balloon, called the Avorio-Prassone, which was similar to the Caquot but more spherical, although it was still able to generate some aerodynamic lift and, like the Caquot, had three fins for stability.

== Army use ==
The Parseval was in widespread use from the end of the 1800s in large numbers by the German Army to direct gunfire from heavy artillery.

The French continued to operate spherical balloons, until deciding to abandon them in 1912 when reconnaissance aeroplanes became a practical alternative. By 1914, they too realized, with the British, the usefulness of captive balloons, as unlike aircraft, they could remain on station for hours, when most aeroplanes had an endurance limited to about two hours. The French Army at one point had 76 companies operating Caquot balloons.

The first aircraft-on-aircraft rocket attack was made on 22 May 1916 when a group of eight French aces including Charles Nungesser made a dawn attack while flying Nieuport 16s armed with eight Le Prieur rockets each, that shot down six balloons. This panicked the German high command into lowering all their balloons along the entire front and blinding their Army to a French counter-attack on Fort Douaumont. Certain aces on both sides known for going after the kite balloons became known as "balloon busters".

== Naval use ==
Although their primary use was by armies to spot the fall of artillery shells and observe enemy movements, the cruisers and battleships of several nations were also equipped to operate Parseval kite balloons to direct gunfire like their army counterparts. Twenty four French Navy vessels were equipped to handle Caquot balloons, with large vessels using the type R to direct gunfire, while smaller escort vessels used the type P and type P.2 against submarines. Although only ten were in service in July 1917, by July 1918 over 200 were in service.

During the Atlantic U-boat campaign of World War I, Caquot balloons were used by American destroyers escorting merchant ship convoys. A balloon observer could often see submerged submarines invisible to observers on the ship and could notify the ship of U-boats and their evasive maneuvers during a depth charge attack, by telephone. The availability of an elevated visual observation platform significantly enhanced the ability of destroyers to find and attack U-boats prior to the invention of sonar.

A shortage of crews prevented more widespread use of kite balloons even after the United States Navy established a training program in October 1917, at Goodyear in Akron, Ohio.

The only casualty from the use of a kite balloon by the United States occurred on 14 August 1918, during an unsuccessful attempt to lower a balloon onto the deck of a destroyer while escorting an eastbound convoy through the Irish Sea. During a stormy evening, the balloon alternately plunged port and starboard as the tether was shortened, dipping the basket into the water on each dive. The crewman in the basket was lost before the balloon could be fully lowered.

The U.S. Navy commissioned the specialized kite balloon tender USS Wright (AZ-1) in December 1921 and operated it as such until July 1922, when the ship was converted to a seaplane tender with the hull symbol AV-1.

== See also ==
- Kytoon
- Rotor kite
