= Parseval-Sigsfeld kite balloon =

German-made observation balloon type

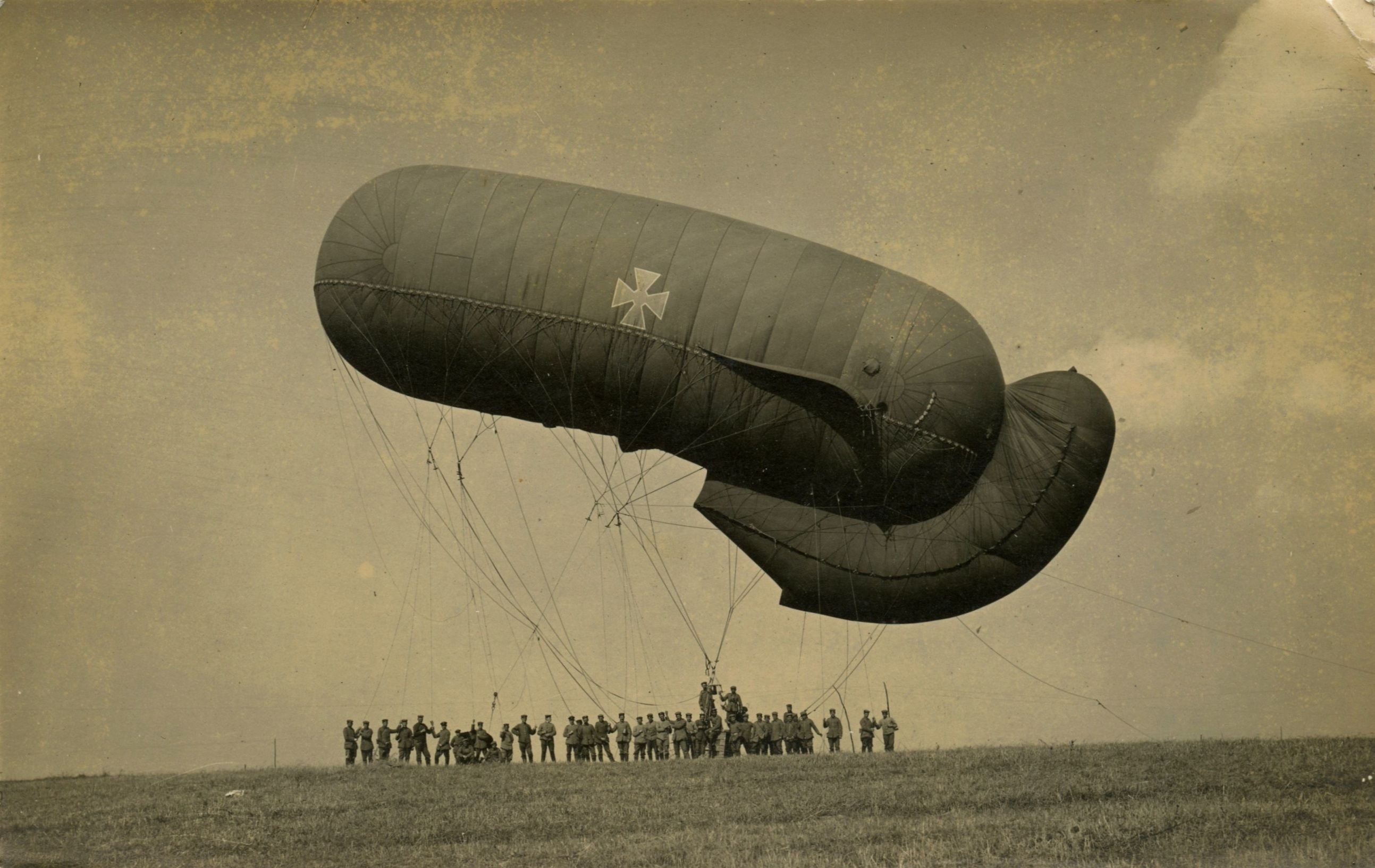
- German Parseval-Sigsfeld balloon near Équancourt, 22 September 1916

General information
- Type: Observation balloon
- National origin: Germany
- Manufacturer: August Riedinger Balloon Plant, Augsburg, Germany
- Designer: August von Parseval, Hans Bartsch von Sigsfeld
- Status: Dismantled
- Primary user: Imperial German Army
- Number built: hundreds

History
- First flight: 1898
- Retired: c. 1920

The Parseval-Sigsfeld kite balloon (German: Parseval-Sigsfeld Drachenballon) was a type of non-rigid military observation balloon, designed in 1898 by August von Parseval and Hans Bartsch von Sigsfeld. Its aerodynamic shape and the rear air capsule ensured a stable position owing to the force of the wind, similar to the way in which kites are stabilized; for this reason it was known as the kite balloon (German: Drachenballon).

This aircraft was widely used as the main observation balloon type by the Central Powers during World War I.

== Design ==
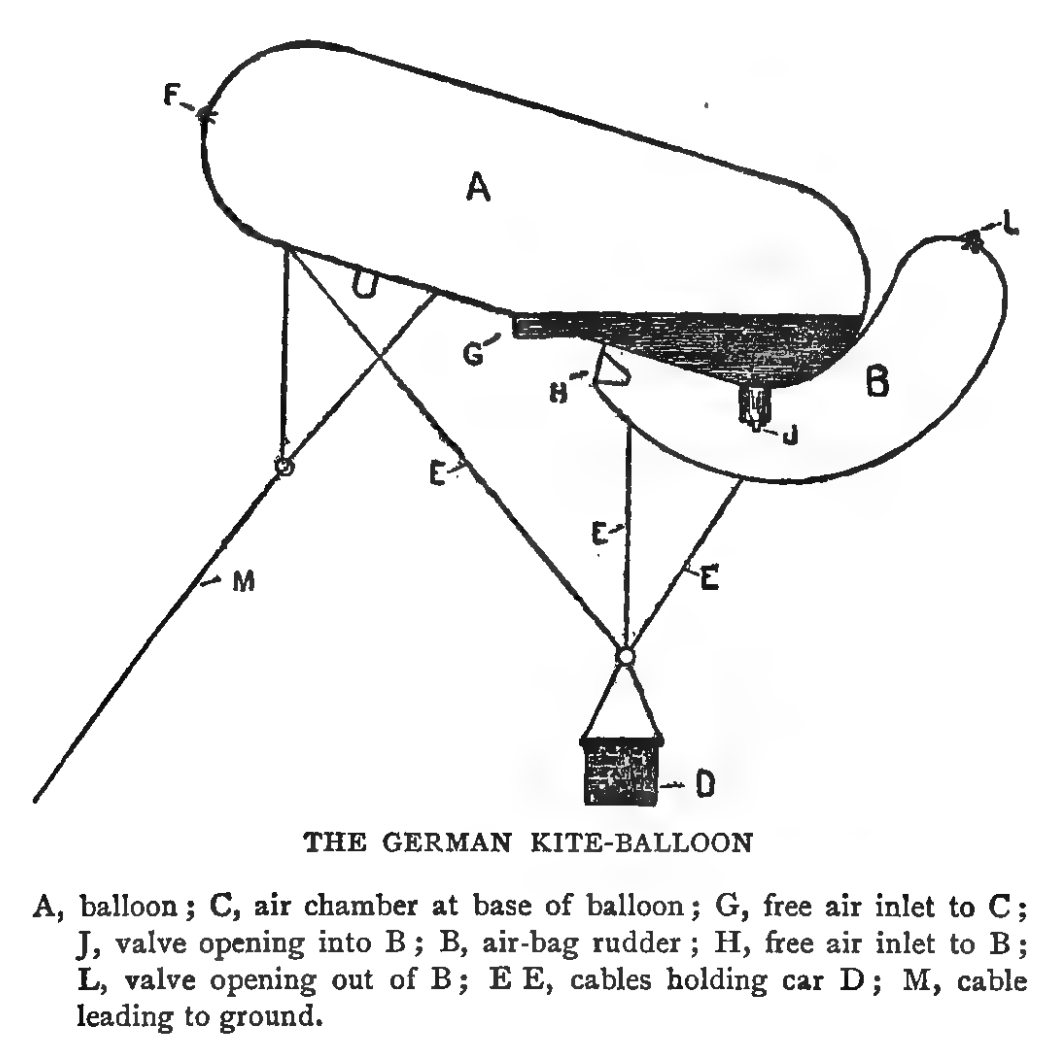
Parseval-Sigsfeld kite balloon diagram (Airships in peace & war, 1910)

German airship factory owner, August von Parseval, and German military officer, Hans Bartsch von Sigsfeld, had been experimenting with different balloon shapes since 1893, previously using spherical shapes that had proved to be unstable in windy weather. Around 1898 they constructed a balloon with an elongated shape, equipped with stabilizers, which were later replaced by suitably shaped air chambers. Under the pressure of the wind (the permissible speed for the balloon was 10 m/s) it would settle into a stable position, with the canopy raised about 30‍–‍40° in the direction of the wind.

A two-person observation balloon had a tether with a volume of 760 m^{3}. The envelope had a diameter of 6.68 metres and a cylindrical shape with semi-circular ends. In the rear part of the envelope was a stabilizer with a characteristic phallic shape, which was filled with air under wind pressure. Volume compensation was regulated by a ballonet.

== Operational history ==
The positive flight characteristics of the Parseval-Sigsfeld kite balloon led the high command of the Imperial German Army to apply this balloon design for military service, as implemented by the Austro-Hungarian Army. The type was produced and used in large quantities during World War I, not only by the German and Austro-Hungarian troops but also by the French, who undertook its minor production based on captured examples under the designation Ballon Captif type G and the modernized type H.

Two balloons of this type were taken over by the Poles in January 1919 in the airship hall at Winogrady in Poznań. One of them was used for the first balloon ascent in independent Poland, which took place on 23 July 1919. As an outdated equipment, it was then used for training observers at the Officers' Aeronautical School. In 1920, the balloons were replaced by Caquot type R balloons imported from France.

== Specifications ==
General characteristics

- Length: 27.54 m (90 ft 4 in)
- Diameter: 6 m (19 ft 8 in)
- Volume: 760 m^{3} (27,000 cu ft)

Performance Armament
None

== Gallery ==
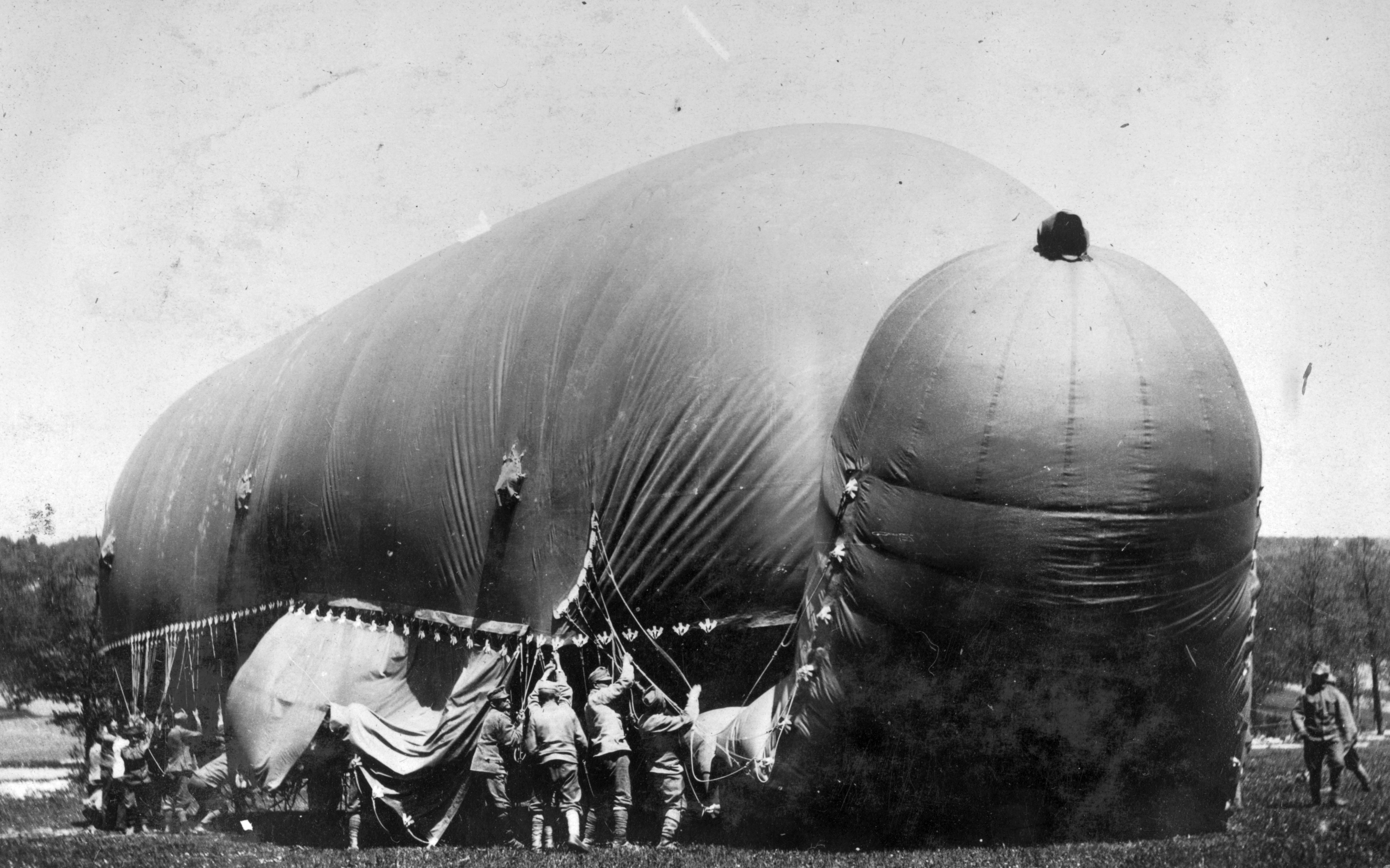
Austro-Hungarian Parseval-Sigsfeld during take-off preparations

Parseval-Sigsfeld balloon of the Swiss Army

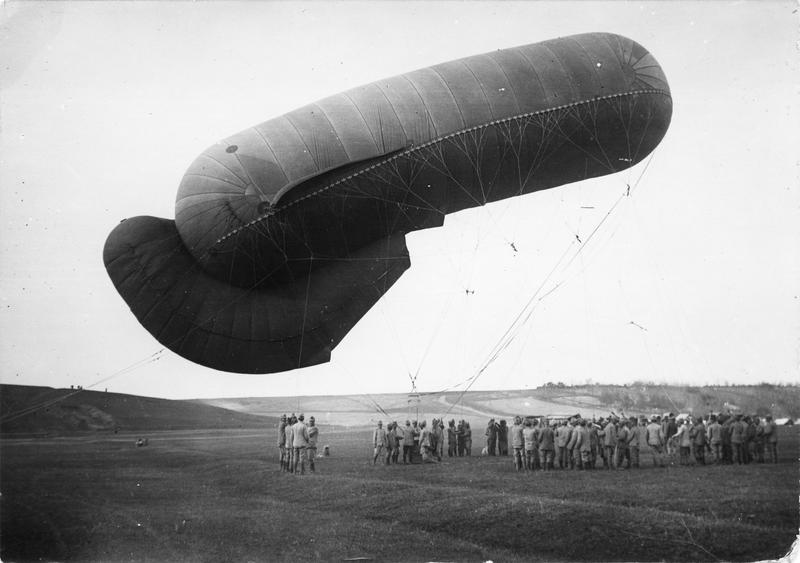
A Romanian Parseval-Sigsfeld in 1917

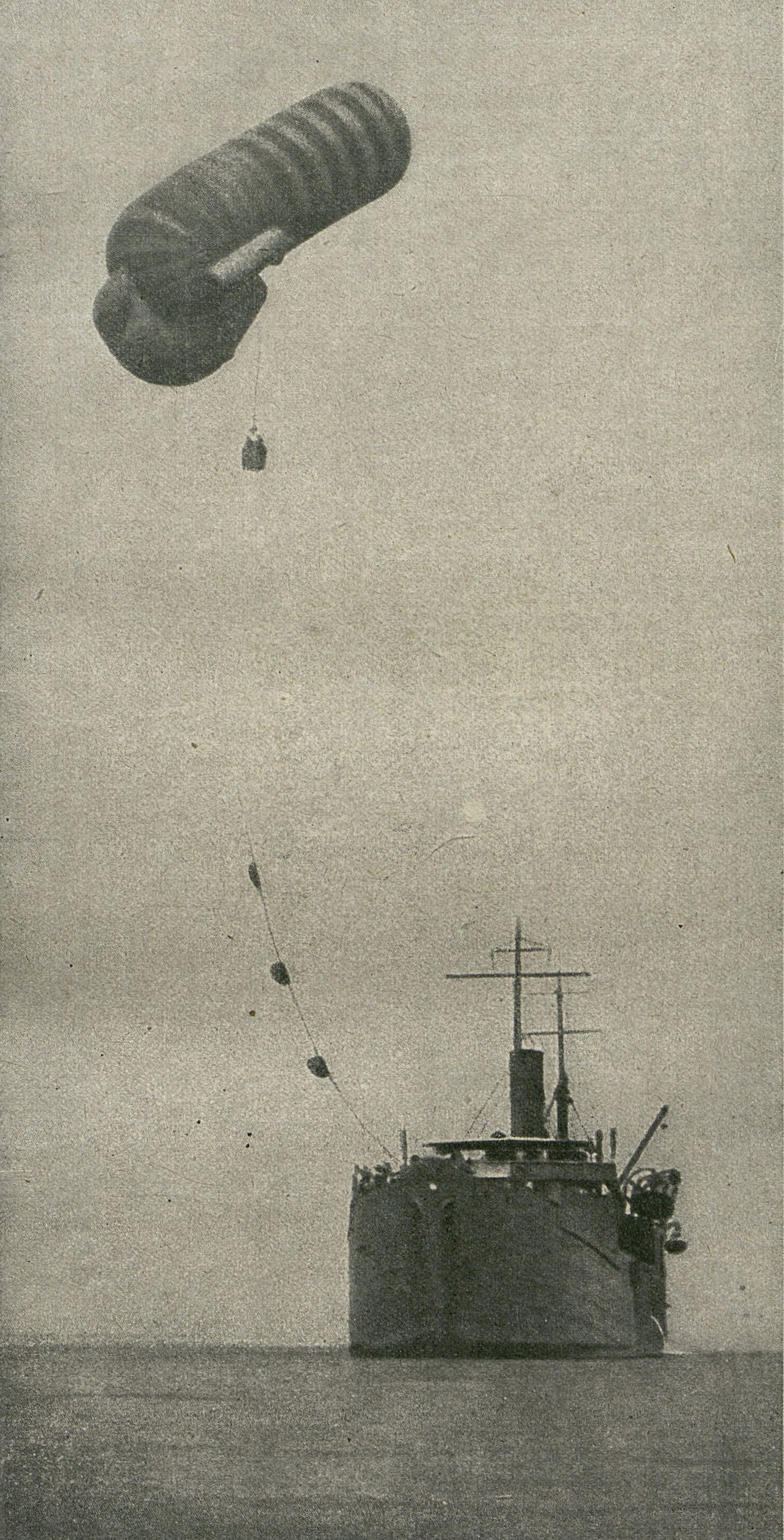
British balloon-mother ship HMS Manica launching a Parseval-Sigsfeld balloon off the coast of German East Africa to locate German battery positions (c. 1917)
