= Bruno Thürlimann =

Swiss civil engineer

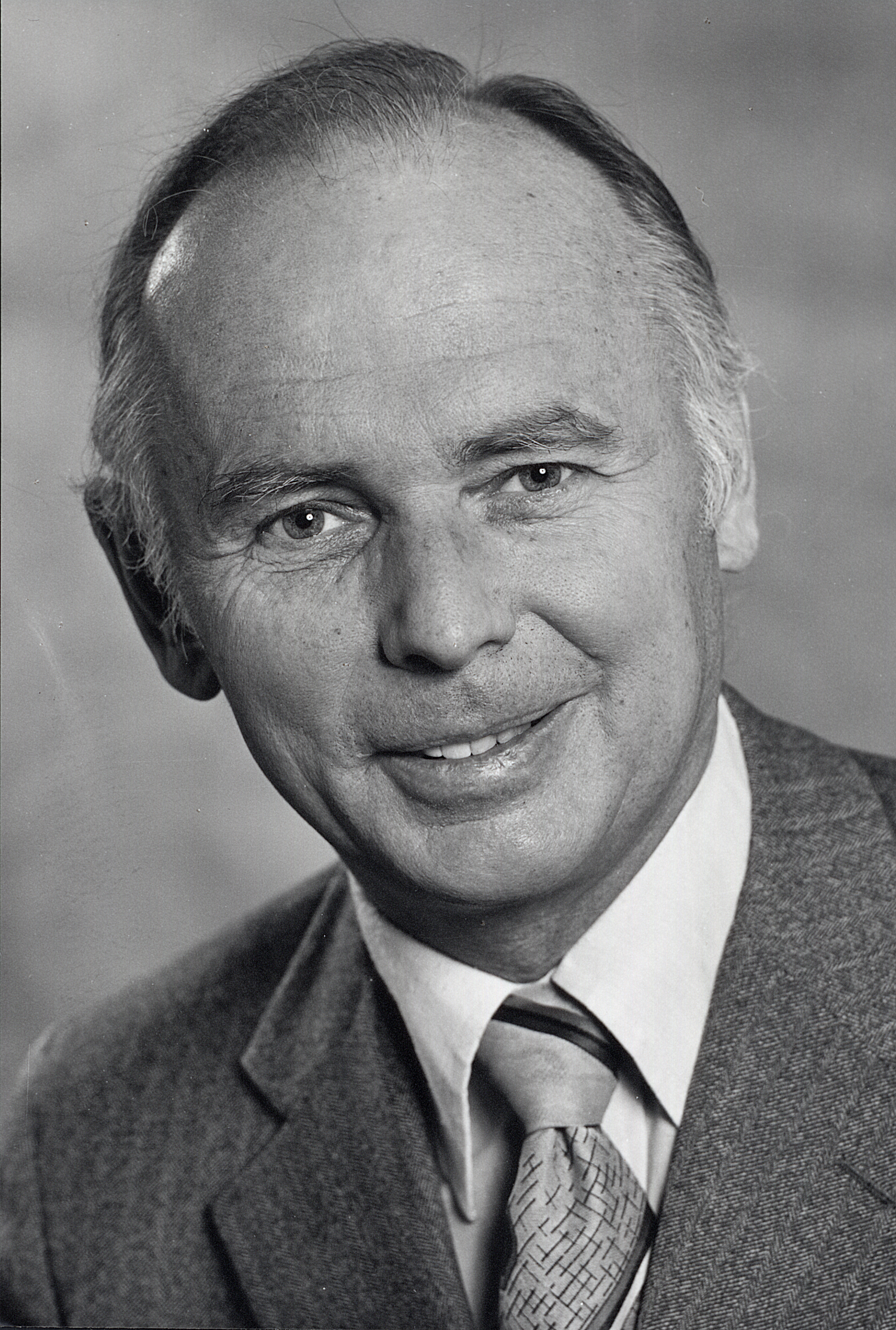

Bruno Thürlimann (6 February 1923 in Gossau, St. Gallen - 29 July 2008 in Meilen) was a Swiss civil and structural engineer, and professor at ETH Zurich. He served as president of the International Association for Bridge and Structural Engineering from 1977 to 1985, and was an honorary member of the American Society of Civil Engineers. He was the recipient of the International Award of Merit in Structural Engineering in 1997.
