= Albert Caquot =

French engineer

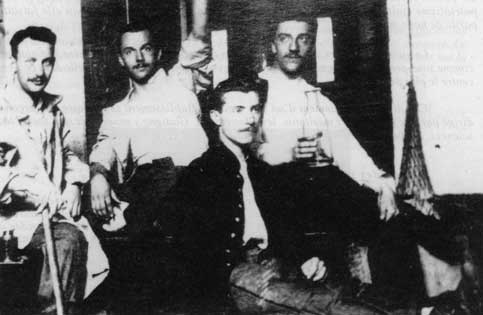
- Albert Caquot, wearing a dark suit in the foreground, in École Polytechnique premises, Paris, ca 1900.
- Born: 1 July 1881; Vouziers, Ardennes, France
- Died: 28 November 1976 (aged 95); Paris, France
- Education: École Polytechnique, 1899; Ponts et Chaussées
- Occupations: Engineer and inventor

Albert Irénée Caquot (French pronunciation: [albɛʁ iʁene kako]; 1 July 1881 – 28 November 1976) was a French engineer. He received the “Croix de Guerre 1914–1918 (France)” (military honor) and was Grand-croix of the Légion d’Honneur (1951). In 1962, he was awarded the Wilhelm Exner Medal. He was a member of the French Academy of Sciences from 1934 until his death in 1976.

== Early life ==
Albert was born to Paul Auguste Ondrine Caquot and his wife, Marie Irma (nee Cousinard). They owned a family farm in Vouziers, in the Ardennes, near the Belgian border. His father taught him modernism, by installing electricity and telephone as early as 1890. One year after high school, at eighteen years old, he was admitted at the Ecole Polytechnique ("year" 1899). Six years later, he graduated in the Corps des Ponts et Chaussées.

== Career ==
From 1905 to 1912, he was a project manager in Troyes (Aube) and was pointed out for civil work improvements he undertook with the city sewer system. This protected the city from the centennial flood of the River Seine in 1910. In 1912, he joined a leading structural engineering firm where he applied his unique talent as a structure designer.

Albert Caquot conducted research and immediately applied it in construction. His most notable contributions include the following:

- Reinforced concrete design and structural engineering in a broader sense. In 1930, he defined the intrinsic curve and explained why the elasticity theory was insufficient for modern structure design.
- Geotechnics and foundation design. He stated the corresponding states theorem (CST). In 1933, his publication on the stability of pulverulent and coherent material received an admiring report from the French Academy of Sciences, where he was elected a life member in 1934. In 1948, with Jean Kérisel (1908–2005), his son-in-law and disciple, he developed an advanced theory extremely important for passive earth pressure (LINK) where there is soil-wall friction. This principle has been broadly applied ever since for the design of ground engineering structures such as retaining walls, tunnels, and foundation piles.
- The revival of cable-stayed bridges with reinforced concrete (Donzère Mondragon bridge, 1952), which he envisioned with long spans, even crossing the English Channel. In 1967, he designed a conceptual double-deck bridge of this type with 810 m-wide spans and two 25 m-wide deck stages accommodating eight lanes for cars, 2 for rail, and 2 for Skytrain.

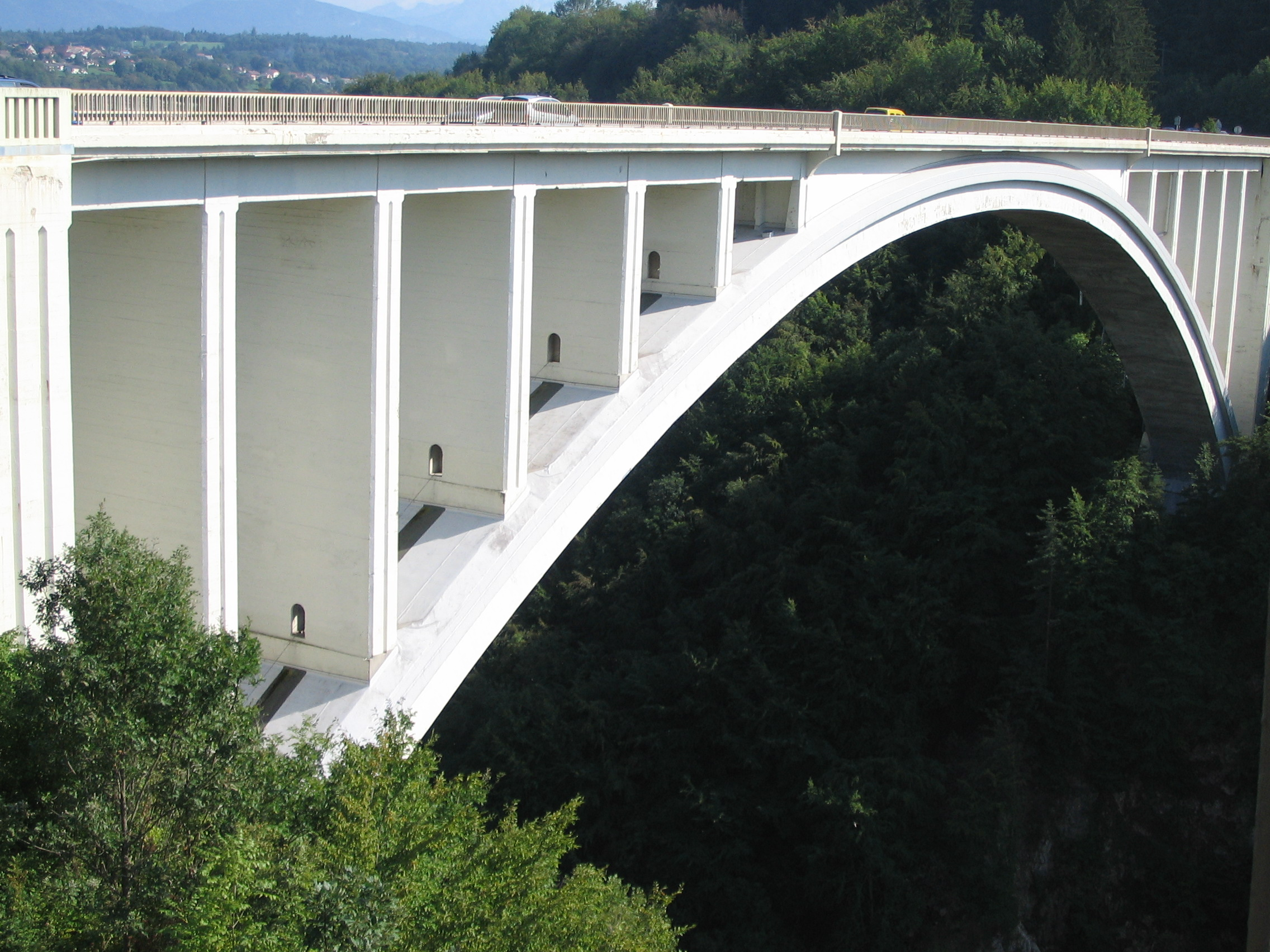
The new La Caille bridge near Annecy, 1928.

In the course of his life, Albert Caquot taught mechanical science for a long time in three of the most prominent French engineering schools in Paris: Écoles nationales supérieures des Mines, des Ponts et de l’Aéronautique.

In the course of his career as a designer, he designed more than 300 bridges and facilities, among which several were world records at the time:

- the La Madeleine Bridge, in Nantes (1928), a concrete cantilever bridge over the River Loire,
- the Lafayette Bridge crossing the tracks of the Gare de l’Est in Paris (1928). This is a truss bridge in reinforced concrete, where concrete vibrators using compressed air were used for the first time in history,
- the new La Caille Bridge (1928), on the ravine of Usses, in the Alps, close to Annecy. This is a 140-m-span concrete arc bridge,
- the great Louis Joubert dry dock (Normandie-Dock) in the port of Saint-Nazaire (1929–1933),

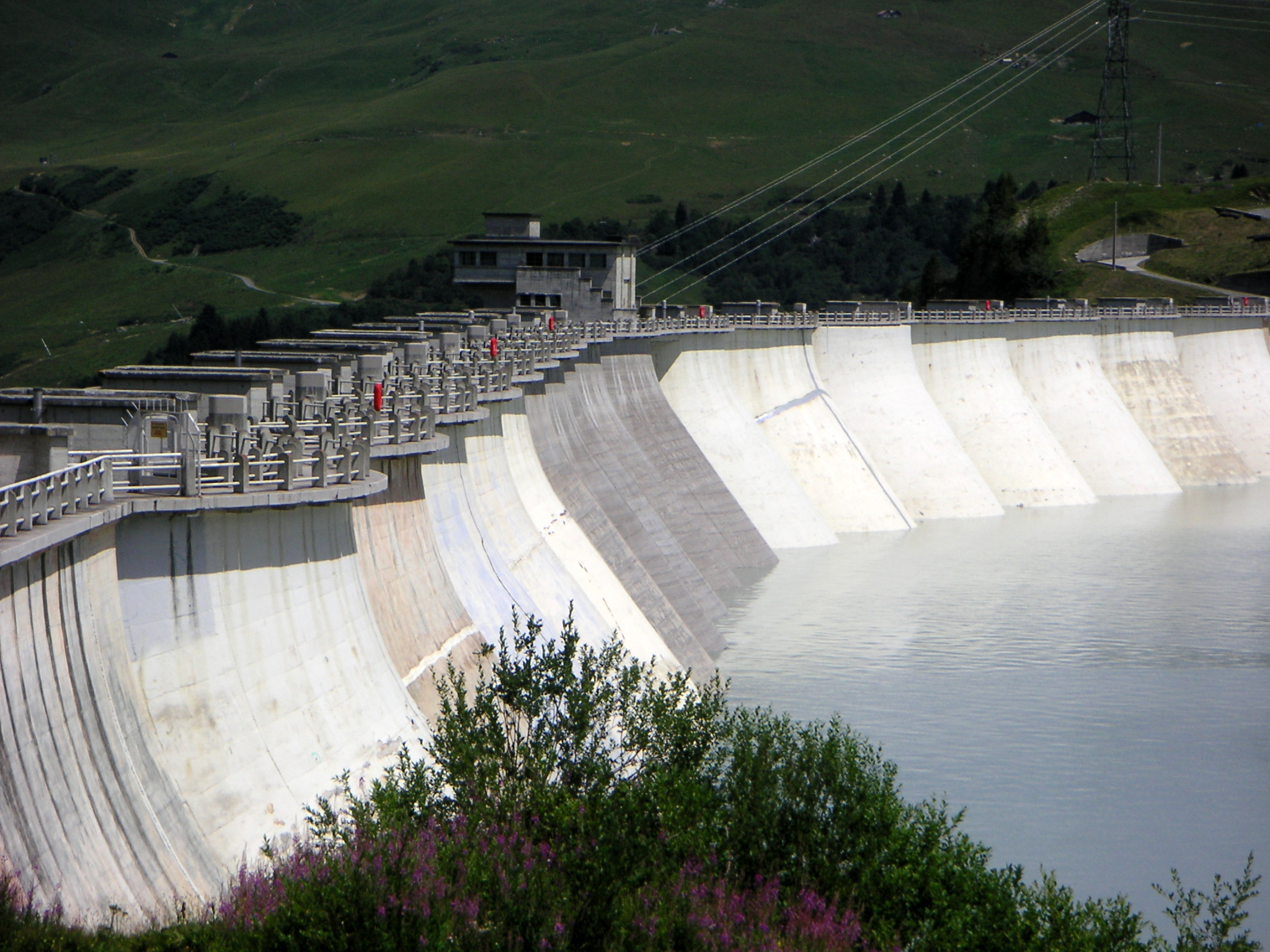
Dam of La Girotte (Alps, France), 1949.

- the La Girotte Dam (1944–1949),
- the Bollène lock, on the left side (navigating downwards) of the Donzère-Mondragon Dam (built on the Donzère-Mondragon Canal, lateral to the Rhône river), the world's tallest lock (1950),
- the Bildstock tunnel (1953–1955),
- the world's largest tidal power plant on the River Rance, in Brittany (1961–1966). In his eighties, Albert Caquot made a critical contribution to the construction of the dam, designing an enclosure in order to protect the construction site from the 12-m-high ocean tides and the strong streams.

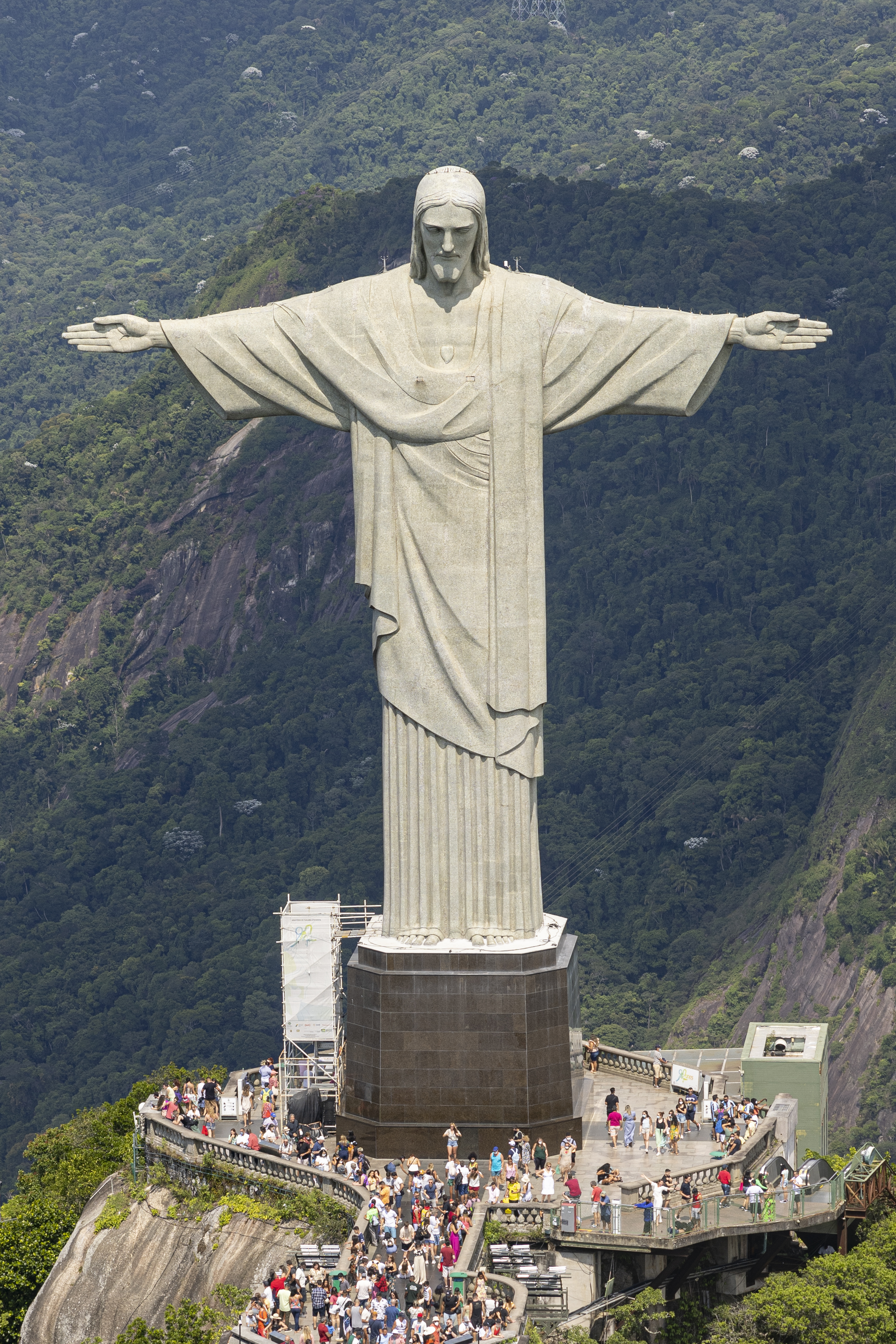
Christ the Redeemer, Rio de Janeiro, the internal structure was built by Caquot, 1931

Two prestigious achievements made him famous internationally: the internal structure of the Christ the Redeemer statue in Rio de Janeiro (Brazil) at the peak of Corcovado Mountain (1931) and the George V Bridge on the Clyde River in Glasgow (Scotland) for which the Scottish engineers asked for his assistance.

In his late eighties, he developed a gigantic tidal power project to capture the tide energy in Mont St Michel bay, in Normandy.

=== Aeronautics ===
During the course of his life, he committed alternately to structural and aeronautical engineering, following the rhythm imposed by the First and Second World Wars. Albert Caquot's aeronautics contributions included designing the "Caquot dirigible" and technical innovations at the new French Aviation Ministry, where he created several Fluid Mechanics Institutes that still exist today. Marcel Dassault, whom Albert Caquot charged to develop several major aeronautical projects at the beginning of his career, and mentioned that he was one of the best engineers that aeronautics ever had. He (Albert Caquot) was visionary and ahead of his time. He led aeronautical innovations for forty years.

As early as 1901, already visionary, he performed his military service in an airship unit of the French army. At the beginning of First World War, he was mobilised with the 40e Compagnie d'Aérostiers equipped with Drachen type airships as first lieutenant. He noticed the poor wind behavior of these sausage shaped captive balloons, which were ineffective except in calm conditions.

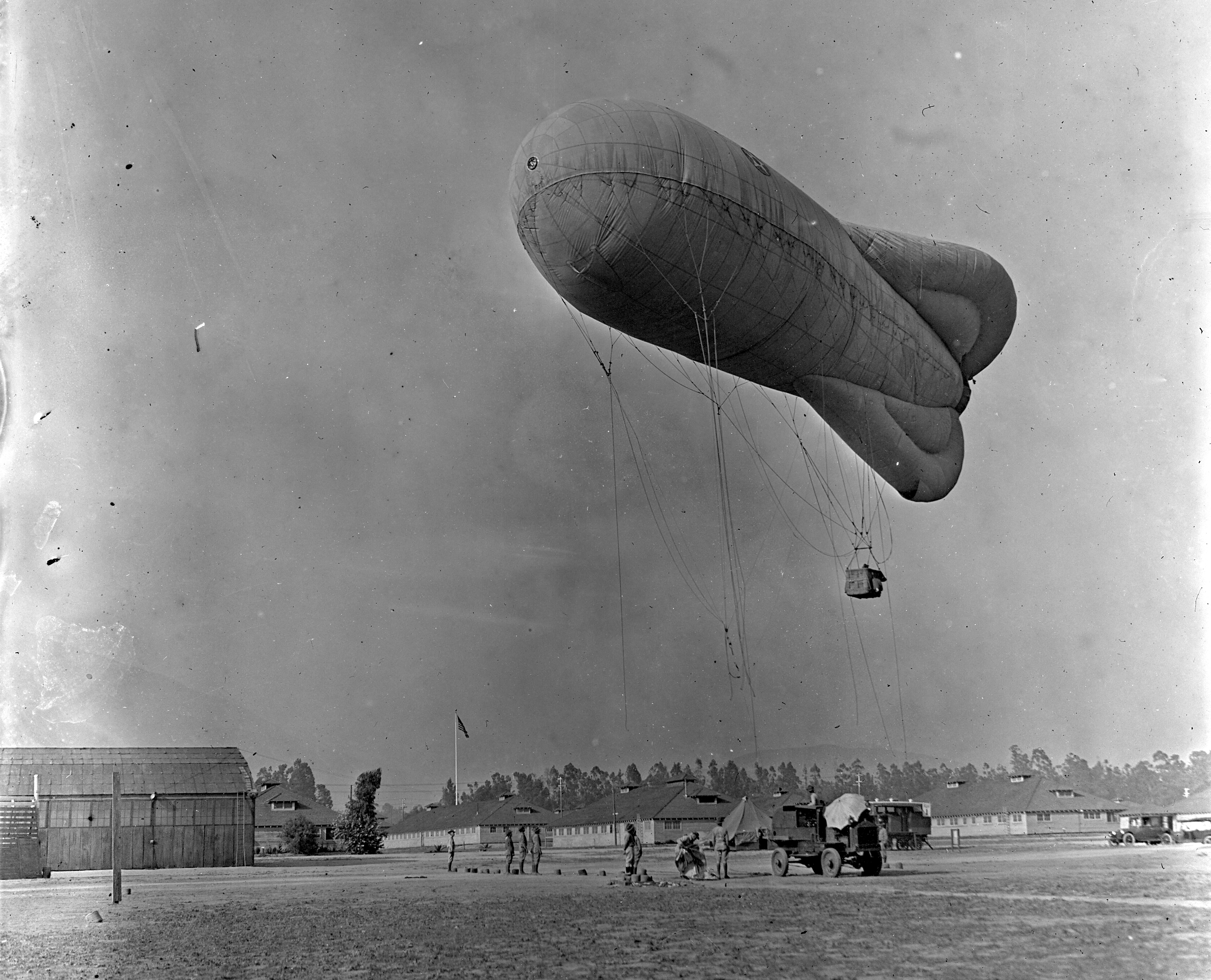
Caquot dirigible

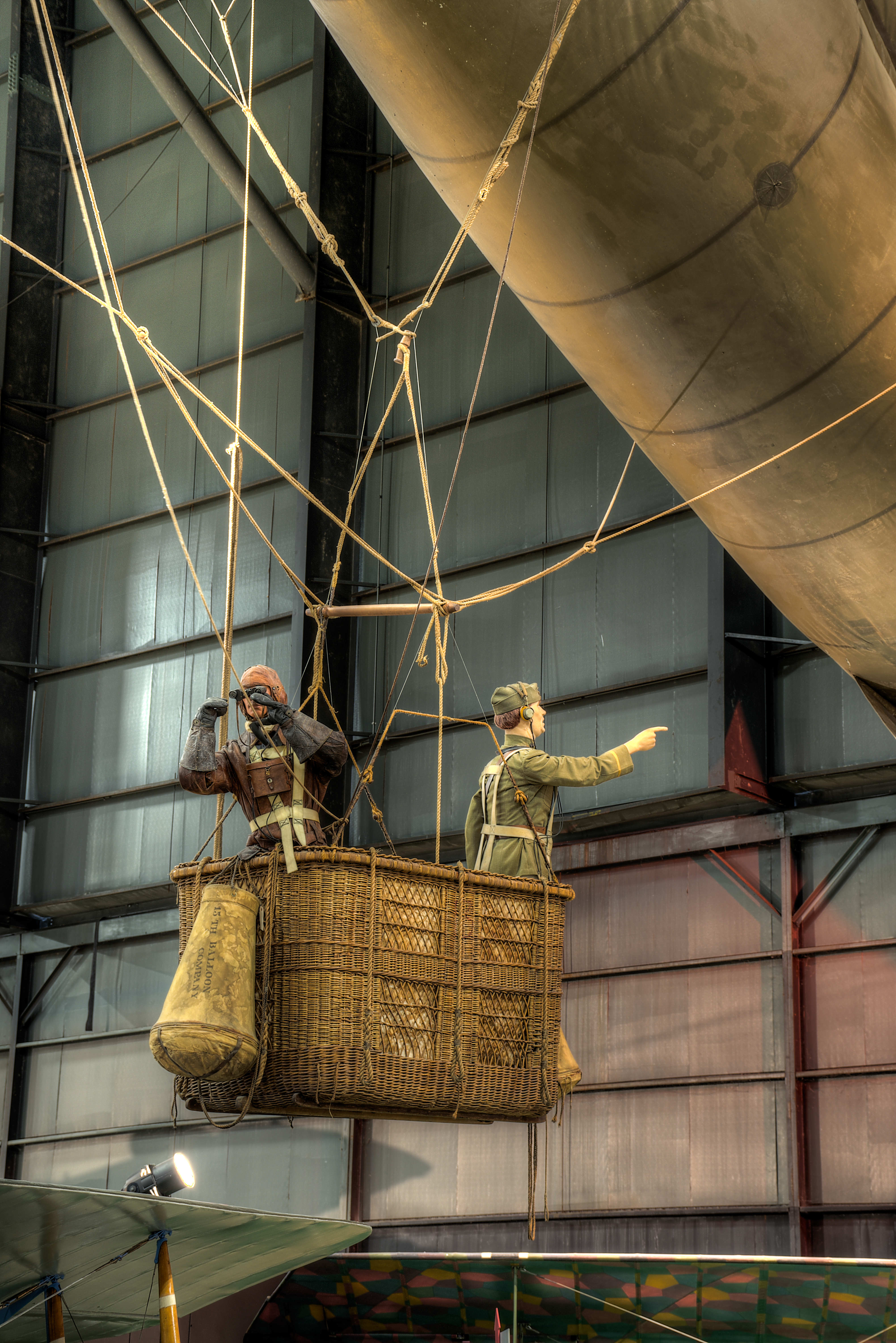
Gondola of Caquot Type R Observation Balloon at the USAF Museum

In 1914, he designed a new sausage-shaped dirigible equipped with three air-filled lobes spaced evenly around the tail as stabilizers. He moved the inner air balloonette from the rear to the underside of the nose, separate from the main gas envelope. The Caquot could hold in 90 km/h winds and remain horizontal. France manufactured "Caquot dirigibles" for all the allied forces, including the English and United States armies, for three years. The United States also manufactured nearly a thousand "Caquot R balloons" in 1918-1919. This balloon gave France and its allies an advantage in military observation, significantly contributing to the allies' supremacy in artillery and aviation and eventually to the final victory. In January 1918, Georges Clémenceau named him technical director of the entire military aviation. In 1919, Albert Caquot proposed the creation of the French aeronautical museum (today called Musée de l'Air et de l'Espace, in Le Bourget). This museum is the oldest aeronautical museum in the world.

In 1928, Albert Caquot became the first executive director of the new Aviation ministry. He implemented a research, prototypes, and mass production policy, which contributed quickly to France's leadership in the aeronautical industry. His main accomplishments are:

- the development of fluid mechanics research and education. He nationalized in 1928 the Ecole Nationale Supérieure d’Aéronautique (Sup' Aero), the leading engineering school in aeronautics that contributed to French scientific excellence in aeronautics and led to the creation of several institutions like ONERA (National Office of Aerospace Studies and Research) in 1946 and the CNES (National Center of Space Studies) in 1952. The school still exists today as ISAE-SUPAERO.
- the construction of the gigantic Chalais-Meudon Wind Tunnel in 1929 (120 m-long and 25 m-high) allowing to test an aircraft in real conditions, with engine running and the pilot on board. This wind tunnel was the largest of the world at the time and it was used to test the Dassault Mirage III, the Sud Aviation Caravelle and the Concorde, but also cars like the Peugeot 4 CV and the VW Beetle.

In 1933, after a budget cut prevented him from proceeding with his projects, he resigned and returned to structural engineering for several years.

In 1938, under the threat of the war, Albert Caquot was brought back to manage all the national aeronautical businesses. He resigned in January 1940.

== Legacy ==
On 2 July 2001, a 4.5-FRF (0.69-€) stamp was issued in France to celebrate Albert Caquot's legacy on the 120th anniversary of his birth and the 25th anniversary of his death. A “Caquot dirigeable" and the bridge of La Caille, two of his creations, surround his picture on the stamp.

Since 1989, the Prix Albert Caquot is awarded annually by the French Association of Civil and Structural Engineering.

== See also ==
- Airship
- French Academy of Sciences
- École polytechnique, France
- École des Ponts ParisTech
- Musée de l'air et de l'espace, Le Bourget

== Bibliography ==
- « Albert Caquot 1881-1976 - Savant, soldat et bâtisseur », Jean Kérisel – August 2001
- Bulletin of the SABIX, special number 28 about Albert Caquot, July 2001
- Le Curieux Vouzinois, "Hyppolyte Taine and Albert Caquot", by Jean Kerisel, Vouziers (the Ardennes), 25 March 2001
- Sciences Ouest, numero 112, "L'Ecole Polytechnique et la Bretagne. Le barrage et l'usine maremotrice de la Rance", June 1995
- L'Union, "Une journee particulière en hommage a Albert Caquot", Vouziers (the Ardennes), 25 March 1995
- La Jaune et la Rouge, "Albert Caquot (X 1899)", by Robert Paoli (X 1931), November 1993
- “Albert Caquot - Wilhelm Exner Medaillen Stiftung.” Wilhelm Exner Medaillen Stiftung, 11 May 2022, www.wilhelmexner.org/en/medalists/albert-caquo/.
- “Albert Caquot, 1881–1976.” Géotechnique, vol. 27, no. 3, Sept. 1977, pp. 449–50, https://doi.org/10.1680/geot.1977.27.3.449. ‌‌
