= Caquot kite balloon =

French-made observation balloon type

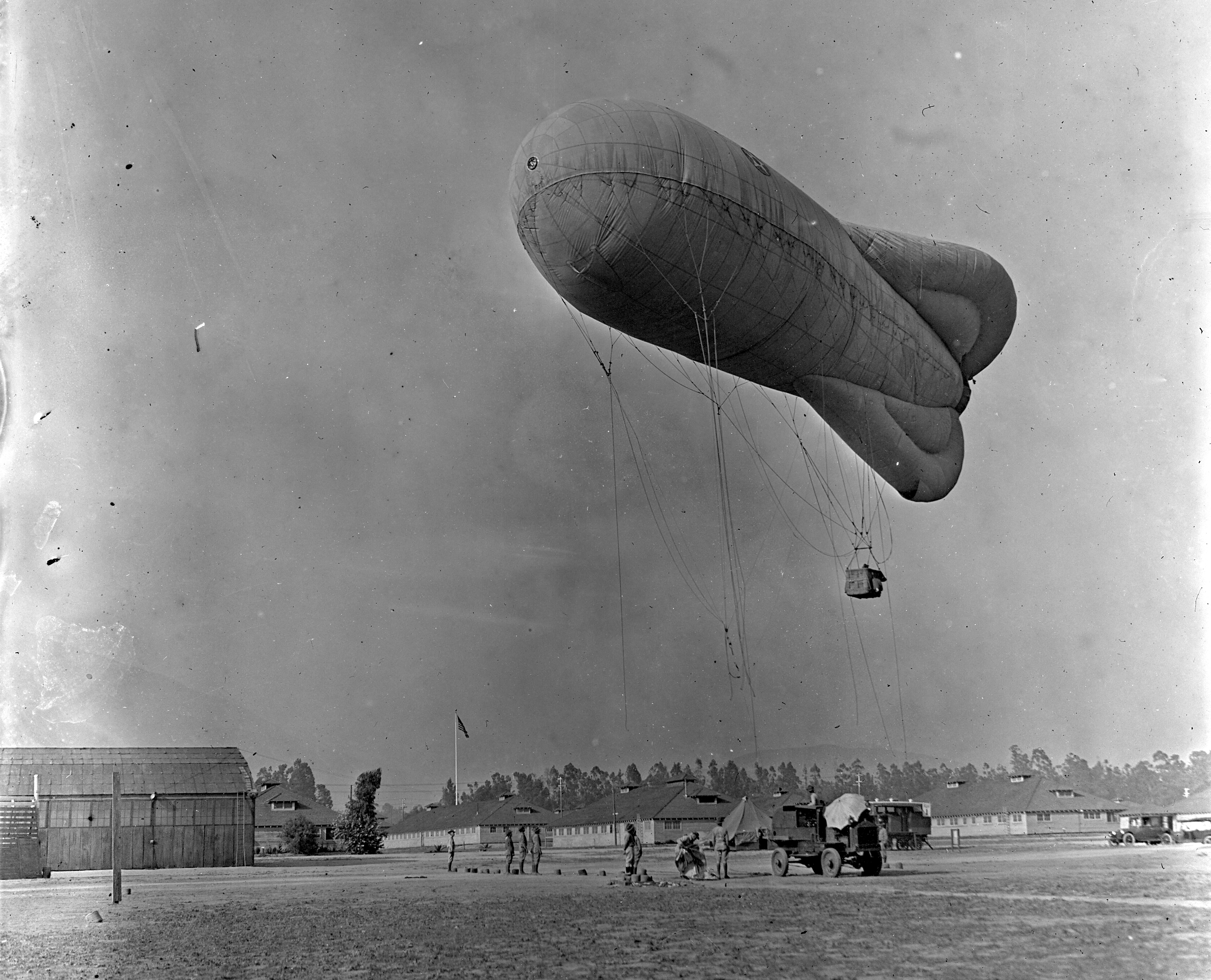
- Caquot type R balloon of the U.S. Army in Arcadia, California, 1921

General information
- Type: Observation balloon
- National origin: France
- Manufacturer: Chalais-Meudon Aeronaitical Factory
- Designer: Albert Caquot
- Primary user: French Army
- Number built: several thousands

History
- First flight: February 1915
- Retired: c. 1960

Caquot kite balloon (in French Caquot Captif) was a type of non-rigid military observation balloon, designed in 1915 by Albert Caquot. The type became widely used by Allied forces in World War I warfare for multiple observation or naval defence uses and later also as an anti-aircraft barrage balloon.

== Design ==
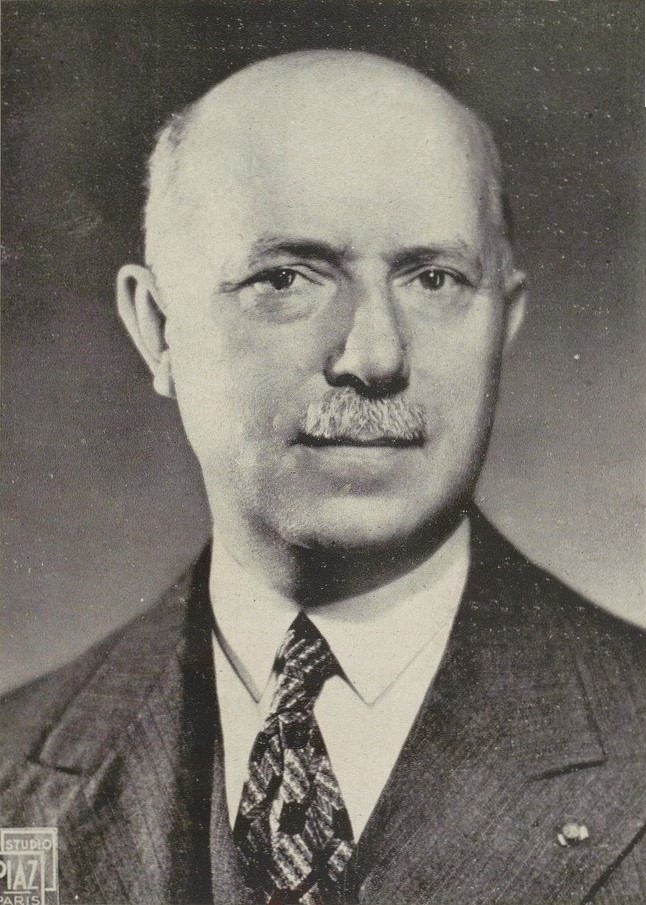
Albert Caquot, c. 1948

At the beginning of World War I French Army headquarters quickly realized a need of observation balloon units, which has been dismantled in 1912. German army used their successful Parseval-Sigsfeld kite balloons (or Drachen) in large quantities, so the first French-produced pieces were produced as a copies of a German original.

Being mobilized on 1 August 1914 as a commander of the 21st company of balloonists, French officer Albert Caquot made some aerial observations in a spherical "Fleurus" type balloon, a type dating from 1880s. To balance a balloon dangling even in light winds Caquot designed a new balloon type stabilized by three inflatable rear lobes arranged at 120° angle. In October 1914 he then sent his plans and calculations to the Chalais-Meudon Aeronaitical Factory and after some vicissitudes Caquot's plans, were approved by General Hirschauer responsible for aviation agenda at the French Ministry of War, in February 1915 the first prototype of Caquot type L kite balloon was finished. Much of the design was taken from Parseval-Sigsfeld kite, but it showed better flight characteristics, like stability and minimal resistance to the wind.

Despite these conclusive tests, mass production was not launched. Thanks to a British Navy officer, present during the tests, Caquot was asked by the British Navy to work on a specific type of kite balloon attached to the ship. Caquot agreed and in summer 1915 finished his M type balloon, able to withstand winds of 125 km/h and equipped with a specific brake which kept the balloon in a certain height. In June 1915, Caquot became the director of the Chalais-Meudon mechanical aerostation workshop, where he was instructed to lead military balloon production by his designs. Between July and the end of November 1916, 46 type M balloons were built in Chalais-Meudon for the British, then the production was retaken by factories in the United Kingdom.

In series production Caquot balloons were divided to four types, different mostly by its gas capacity:

- P - 750 cubic metres (26,000 cu ft) with a capacity of two observers at a height of 500 m (1,600 ft)
- P2 - 820 cubic metres (29,000 cu ft)
- M2 - 930 cubic metres (33,000 cu ft)
- R - 1,000 cubic metres (35,000 cu ft) with a capacity of two observers at a height of 1,000 m (3,300 ft) or three at 500 m)

== Operational history ==
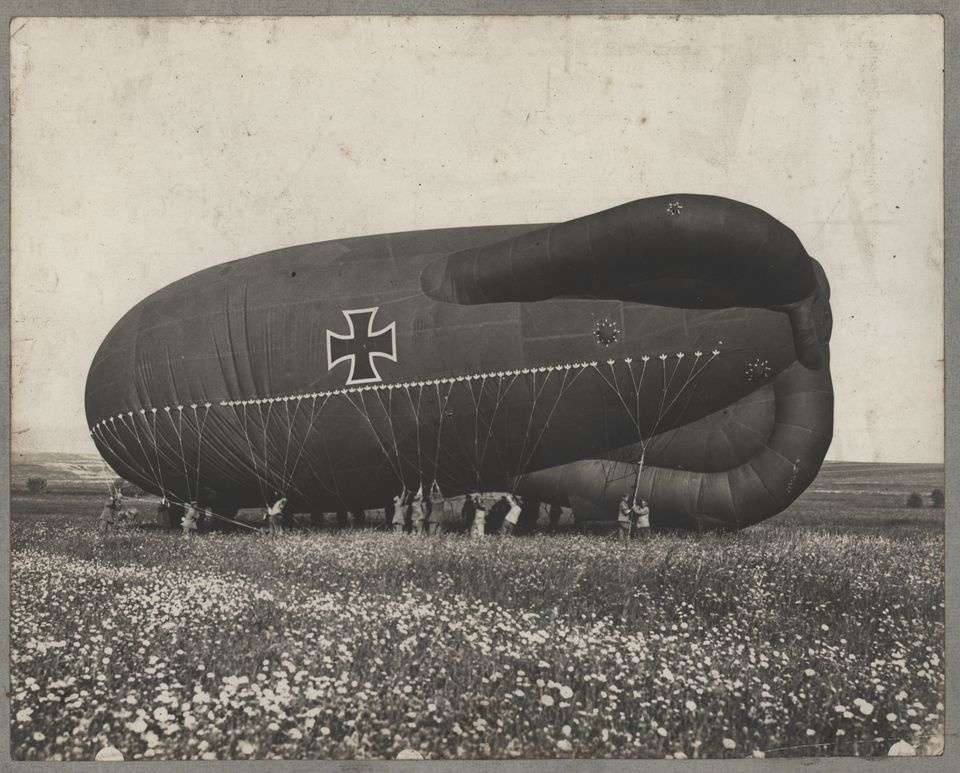
German Ae 800 kite balloon, copy of Caquot design (c. 1917)

British Navy soon realized the reduction of their ship losses using Caquot kites as an effective observational tool against German and Austro-Hungarian U-boats, in 1917 Caquots were adapted also by the French Navy, using types P, P2 and R. In July 1918 it has nearly 200 balloons and special balloon 24 units. Until the end of war, French Army forme 76 units equipped with Caquot balloons, being used for artillery adjustment and general observation of the battlefield. After one of the British Caquot balloons fell into the hands of the Germans around 1917, a German copy signed the Ae 800 (Achthundert English 800).

During the war, from 1915 onwards, France was the leading power in the field of aerostation and built nearly 4,200 captive balloons: 1,700 observation balloons and 2,500 barrage balloons 3, producing 319 units per month in 1919 average. A thousand units served in the U.S. Army between 1918 and 1919, also entered service in other Allied armies and also some of when newly created, like Polish Army. In the United Kingdom production was restored during World War II, British army was using those until the 1960s for testing parachutes, observation missions and for non-combat aerial photography.

=== Barrage balloons ===
In 1917, when the Germans began to attack Paris with bomber planes, Caquot proposed to create barrages with small-volume balloons attached by cables whose would force the bombers to climb higher and reduce their bombing accuracy. This idea was adapted by the British in September 1917 and at the end of the war, there were ten British barrage balloon dams, mainly consisting 900 m^{3} (32,000 cu ft) Caquot M and 1,000 m^{3} (35,000 cu ft) R balloons.

== Specifications (R type) ==
General characteristics

- Length: 28 m (92 ft)
- Diameter: 9.8 m (32 ft)
- Volume: 1,000 m^{3} (35,000 cu ft)

Performance Armament
none

== Gallery ==
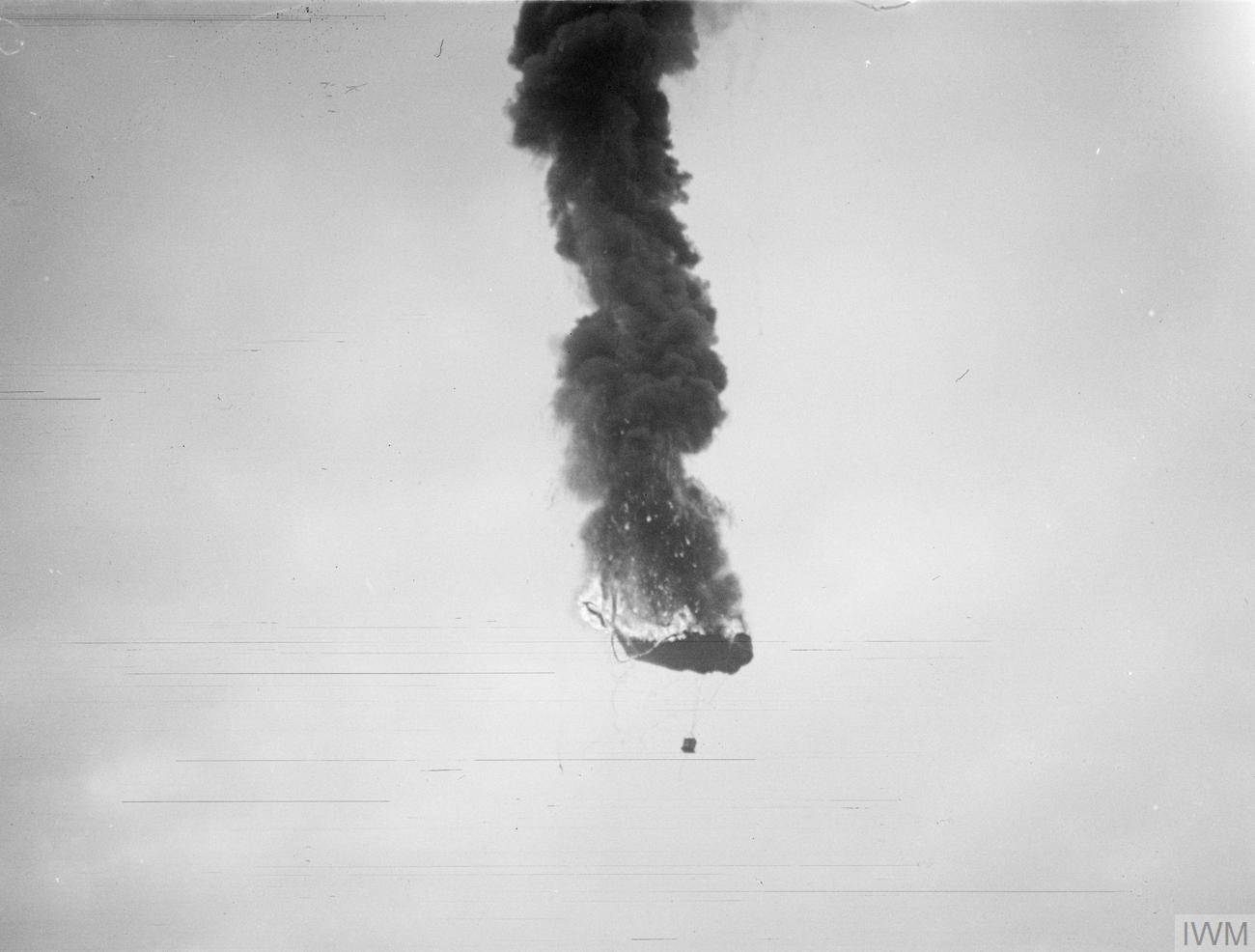
British Caquot balloon falling down in flames after having been attacked by an enemy aircraft near Boyelles, 3 February 1918

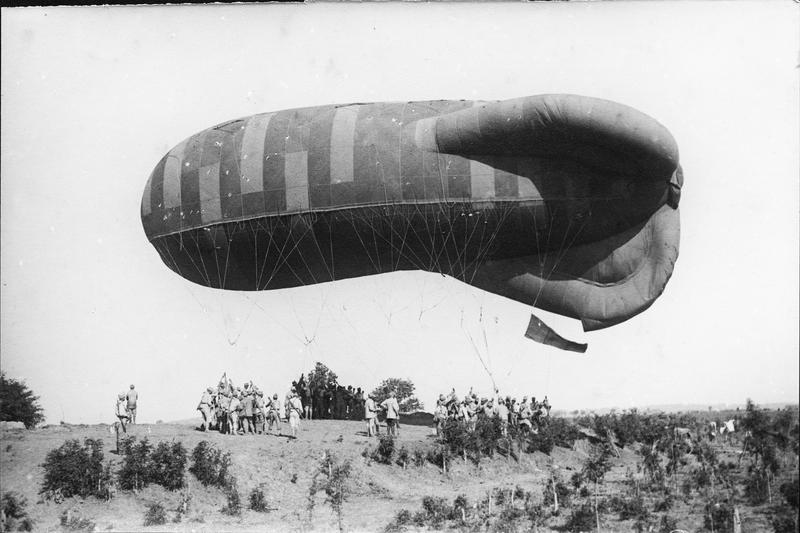
Romanian Caquot being raised near Mărășești

== See also ==
- Kite balloon
- Albert Caquot

== Bibliography ==
- Boyne, Walter J. (2003). The Influence of Air Power upon History. Pelican (www.pelicanpub.com). ISBN 1-58980-034-6.
- Ege, Lennart (1973). Balloons and Airships 1783–1973. Blandford Colour series - The Pocket Encyclopaedia of World Aircraft in Colour. Translated by Hildesheim, Erik. London: Blandfor Press. pp. 168–169. ISBN 0-7137-0568-X.
- The Type "M" Kite Balloon Handbook. Washington, D.C.: United States. Navy Department. Bureau of Construction and Repair. October 1919.
