= Parseval PL 9 =

German-made Ottoman airship

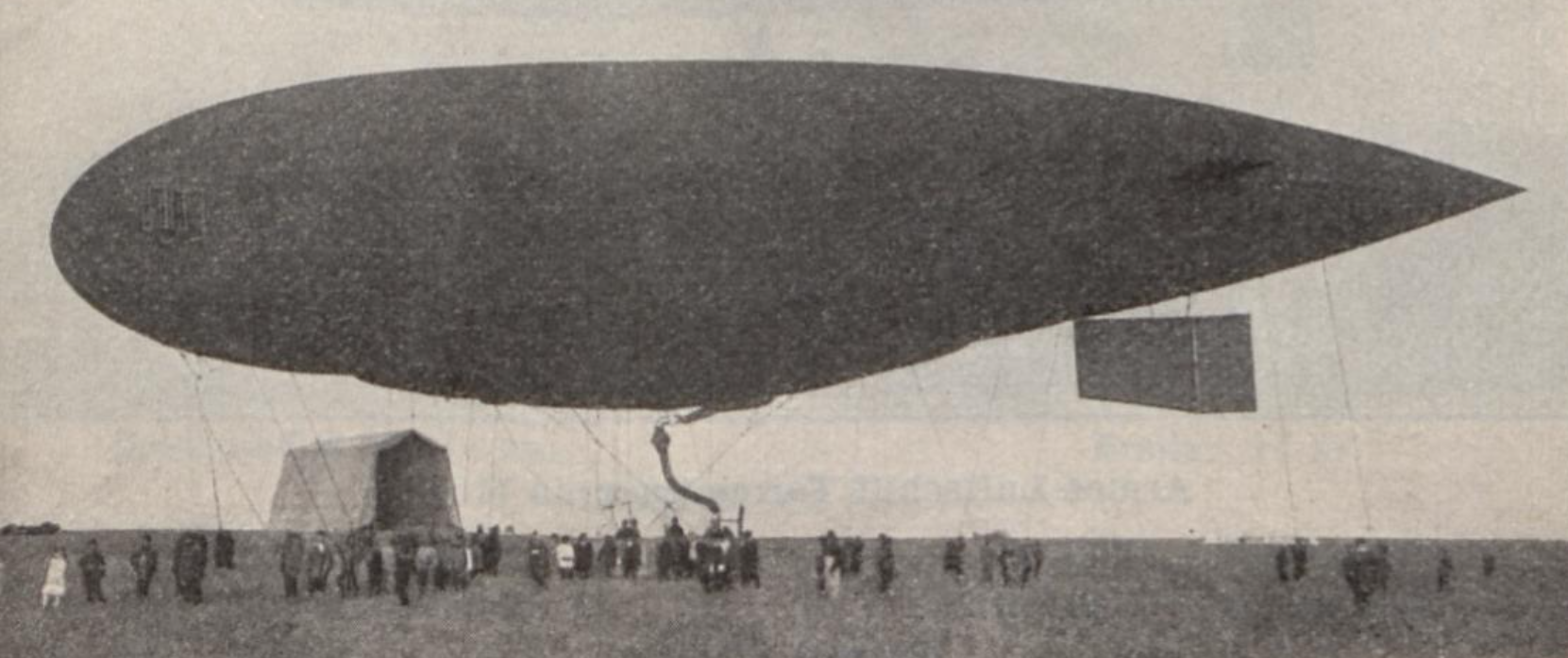
- Parseval PL 9, c. 1910 (Taschenbuch der Luftflotten, 1915)

General information
- National origin: Germany
- Manufacturer: Luft-Fahrzeug-Gesellschaft
- Designer: August von Parseval
- Primary user: Ottoman army
- Number built: 1

Parseval PL 9 (Parseval-Luftschiff 9) was a non-rigid airship made in 1910 by the Luft-Fahrzeug-Gesellschaft in Bitterfeld, devised by German airship designer August von Parseval.

== Operational history ==
Parseval PL 9 was likely built in 1910 by German aircraft manufacturer Luft-Fahrzeug-Gesellschaft, and it was designed by the German airship designer, August von Parseval.

Later in 1911, Parseval PL 9 served as a replacement airship for the Parseval PL 5 after it burned in a fire at Hannoversch Münden. The airship was stationed at Breslau-Gandau warfield in modern-day Wrocław, Poland.

In 1913, Parseval PL 9 was sold to the Ottoman army, becoming the Ottoman Empire's first and only airship.

On July 23, 1913, Parseval PL 9's first flight operated by the Ottoman army happened in Yeşilköy, Turkey. The crew was mostly composed of Turkish and German officers, and engineers. They were able to reach an altitude of 300 meters.

Under Ottoman service, Parseval PL 9 was commanded by airship pioneer and captain, Karl Hackstetter, nicknamed "Hacky-Bey."

By August 1913, Parseval PL 9 had flown three times, but the airship was grounded for repairs shortly after, and it never saw action.

== Specifications ==
Data from

General characteristics

- Length: 50 m (164 ft 1 in)
- Diameter: 10 m (32 ft 10 in)
- Volume: 2,200 m^{3} (77,700 cu ft)
- Useful lift: 1,320 kg (2,910 lb)
- Powerplant: 1 × NAG , 37 kW (50 hp)
- Propellers: single blade, 3 m (9 ft 10 in) diameter (wooden)

Performance

- Maximum speed: 40 km/h (25 mph, 22 kn)
