= Parseval PL 13 =

German-made Japanese airship

Parseval PL 13 Yuhi
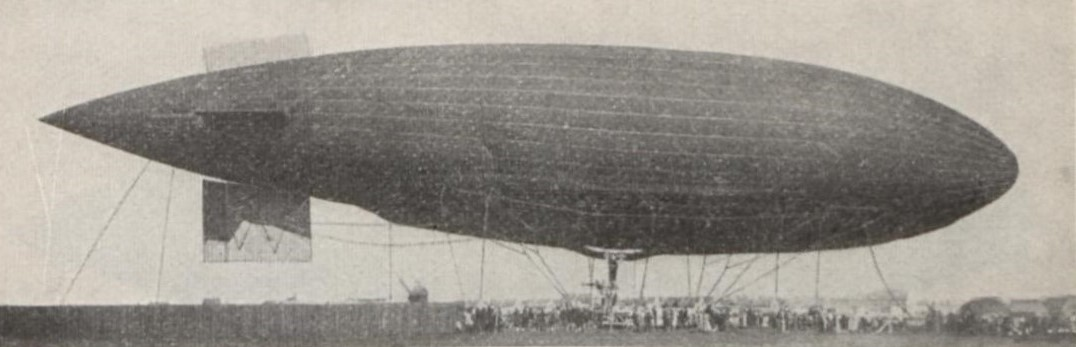
- Parseval PL 13, c. 1915 (Taschenbuch der Luftflotten, 1915)

General information
- Type: Patrol airship
- National origin: Germany
- Manufacturer: Luft-Fahrzeug-Gesellschaft
- Status: Dismantled
- Primary user: Imperial Japanese Army
- Number built: 1

History
- First flight: 26 August 1914
- Retired: July 1917

Parseval PL 13 (Parseval-Luftschiff 13, in Japanese 雄飛, Yuhi) was a non-rigid military single-gondola airship made in 1912 by the Luft-Fahrzeug-Gesellschaft in Bitterfeld, designed by August von Parseval. Ship was bought by the Imperial Japanese Army and served as one of the first military aircraft in the history of Japan.

== Operational history ==
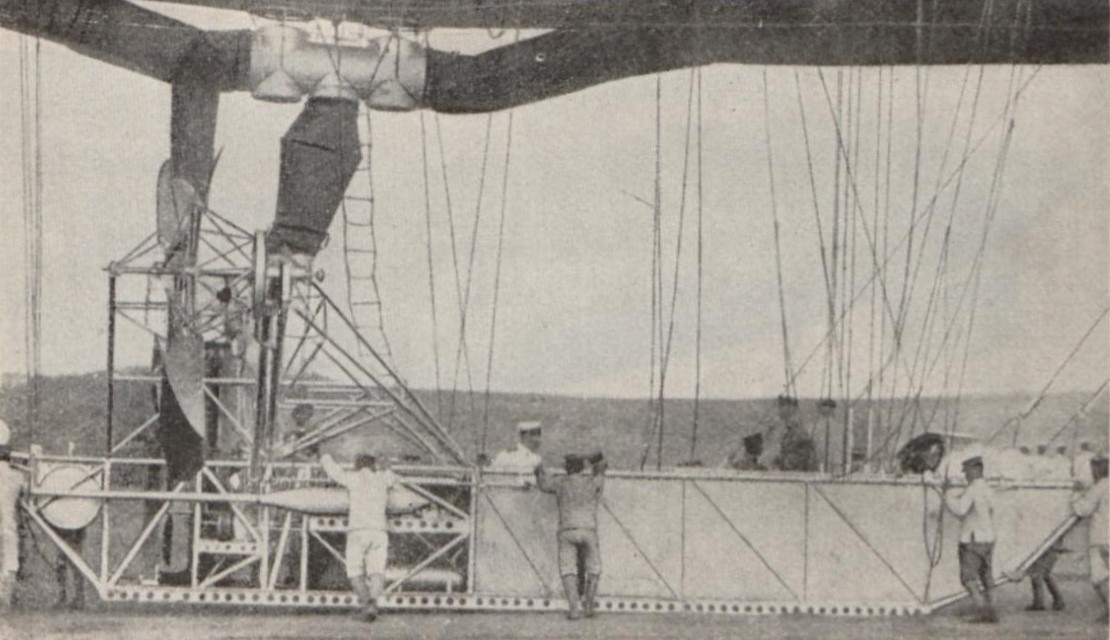
Gondola of the airship

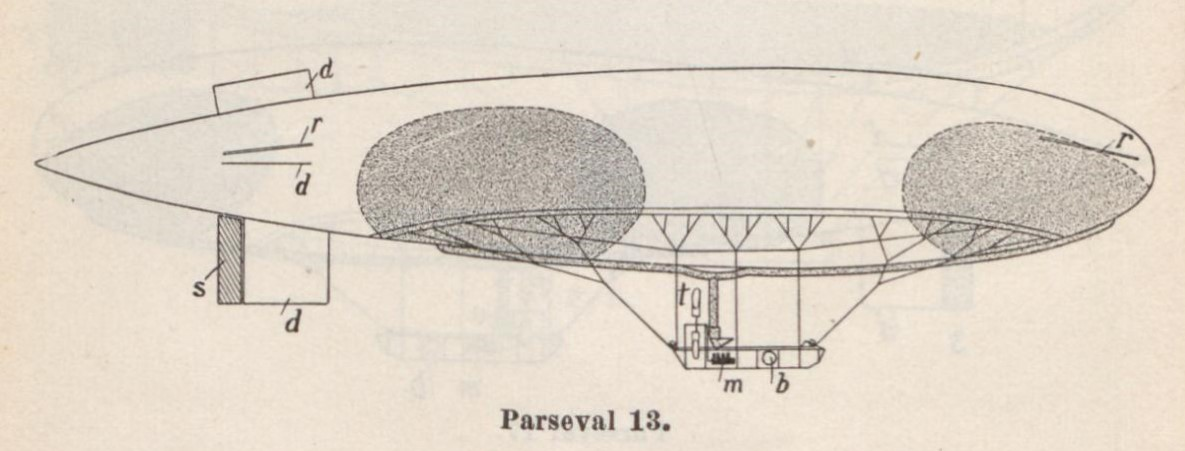
Drawing from Taschenbuch der Luftflotten (1915)

Airship was named Walserwald and in June 1912 imported from German Empire to Japan. After the accident on March 28 1913, which damaged the ship, Walserwald was a repaired and modified in Tokorozawa depot. In 1913 ship was also renamed Yuhi, which means Flyer. Works were finished in August 1914 and Yuhi was commissioned by the Japanese military in April 1915.

On January 22, 1916 (Taisho 5), Yuhi made a test flight from Tokorozawa to Osaka. After the flight 11 hours and 34 minutes long ship safely landed near the town of Toyohashi. The return flight to Tokorozawa was not proceeded due to engine problems, so the aircraft was disassembled and transported by land. Ship was put out of service in July 1917.

To commemorate the first flight, January 22 is now known as "Airship Day." In Tokorozawa City, where the machine was repaired and reconstructed, a special baked confectionery called Yuhi-yaki is sold in commemoration of the flight.

== Specifications ==
General characteristics

- Length: 79 m (259 ft 2 in)
- Diameter: 14.50 m (47 ft 7 in)
- Volume: 8,500 m^{3} (300,000 cu ft)

Performance

== See also ==
- August von Parseval
- Parseval airships (list of all Parseval airships)

== Bibliography ==
- Langsdorff, Werner von (1925). Taschenbuch der Luftflotten (in German). Munich: J. F. Lehmanns. p. 63.
- Akimoto, Minoru (2007). The Story of Japanese Airships - Tracing the Unique Trail of the Aviation World (in Japanese). Kojinsha: Kojinsha NF Bunko. ISBN 9784769825265.
