= Parseval PL25 =

German WW1 airship

PL25
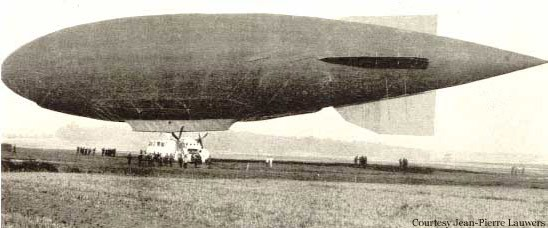

General information
- Type: Patrol airship
- National origin: Germany
- Manufacturer: Luft-Fahrzeug-Gesellschaft
- Status: Dismantled
- Primary user: Imperial German Navy

History
- First flight: 25 February 1915

PL25 (Parseval-Luftschiff 25) was a non-rigid military airship made in 1914/15 by the Luft-Fahrzeug-Gesellschaft in Bitterfeld and was the last single-gondola Parseval. It was one of the largest non-rigid airships before World War II. Its maiden flight was on 25 February 1915. It had a slim teardrop-shaped hull.

== Operational history ==
PL25 served in the Navy, starting with 10 test flights. After 41 reconnaissance missions over the North Sea, the ship undertook 34 flights as a training ship based from Tønder.

As defence against enemy aircraft, a machine gun stand was fitted to the hull's top.

The ship was stationed from 25 March 1915 to 3 November 1915 at Tønder and from 4 November 1915 to 29 March 1916 in Fuhlsbüttel. Hauptmann Stelling and Hauptmann Manger were its commanders.

PL25 was put out of service on 30 March 1916 and dismantled in the Siemens-Hangar at Berlin-Biesdorf (in Marzahn-Hellersdorf, Berlin). PL 25 made 95 flights.

== Specifications ==
General characteristics

- Length: 112.3 m (368 ft 5 in)
- Diameter: 16.40 m (53 ft 10 in)
- Volume: 14,000 m^{3} (494,000 cu ft)
- Powerplant: 2 × Maybach C-X , 154 kW (206 hp) each

Performance

- Maximum speed: 76 km/h (48 mph, 42 kn)

Armament

- 1 × trainable machine gun atop envelope

== See also ==
- August von Parseval
- Parseval airships (list of all Parseval airships)
