= List of Parseval airships =

The Parsevals were 22 airships built between 1909 and 1919 by the Luft-Fahrzeug-Gesellschaft (LFG) following the design of August von Parseval. In the 1920s and 1930s, three more airships were built following the Parseval-Naatz (PN) design.

As with the rival Zeppelins, the airships were, in both English and German, referred to by the name of the inventor. (In German, the nouns were masculine, that is, "der Parseval", "der Zeppelin".)

In contrast to the Zeppelins, the Parsevals were non-rigid or semi-rigid airships, with little or no stiffening structure inside the fabric envelope. The Zeppelins had a rigid internal framework made of duralumin. Both types relied on hydrogen gas to provide lift.

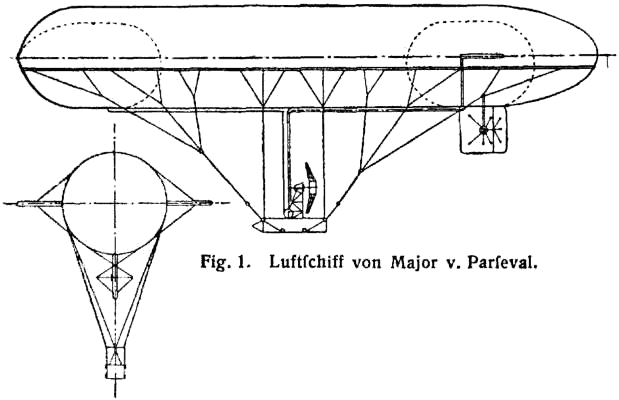
Diagram of an early Parseval airship. The two internal balloons were not for lift generation. They were ordinarily pumped with air when a vessel began losing its shape due to hydrogen's pressure changes.

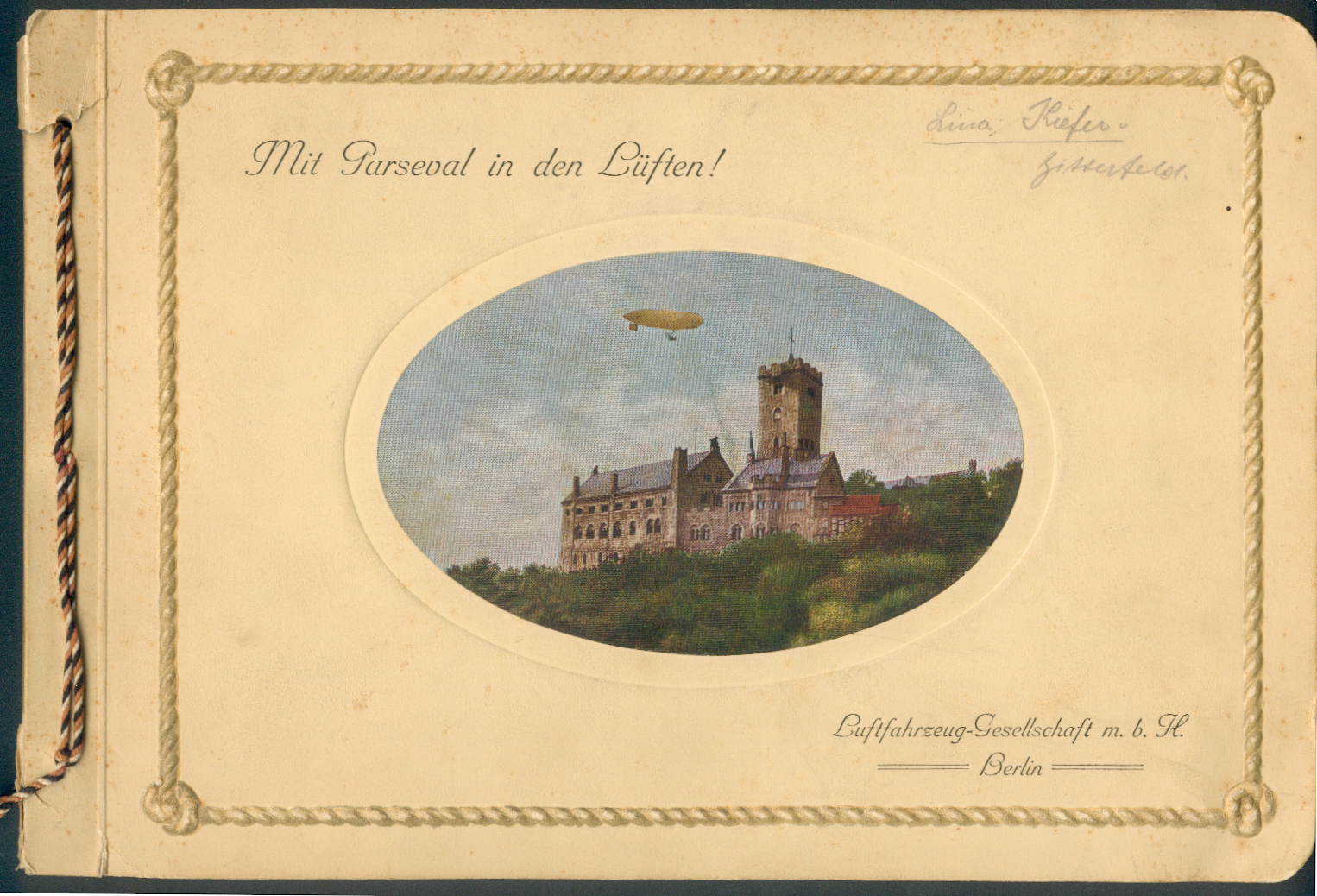
Brochure of the Luftfahrzeug-GmbH

== Experimental airship ==
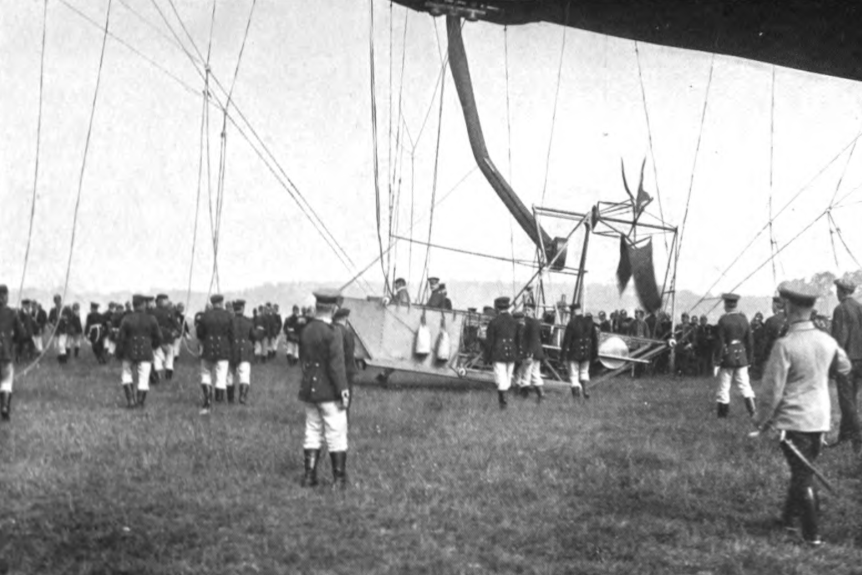
Just before lift off on 26 May 1906, piloted by Captain von Krogh

The Versuchsluftschiff (meaning experimental airship) was Parseval's first model. It was rebuilt several times.

- First flight on 26 May 1906 at Berlin's Tegel, a military field
- Pilot: Captain von Krogh
- Length: 48 m, Diameter: 4.8 m
- Power plant: 62 kW (85 PS) Daimler-Motor
- Max speed: 43.2 km/h
- The hull was completed by the balloon constructer Riedinger and was later increased from 2300 to 2800 cubic metre, the length increased to 50 m
- After all the modifications were completed, from 1909 it was designated "PL 1".

== PL 1 ==
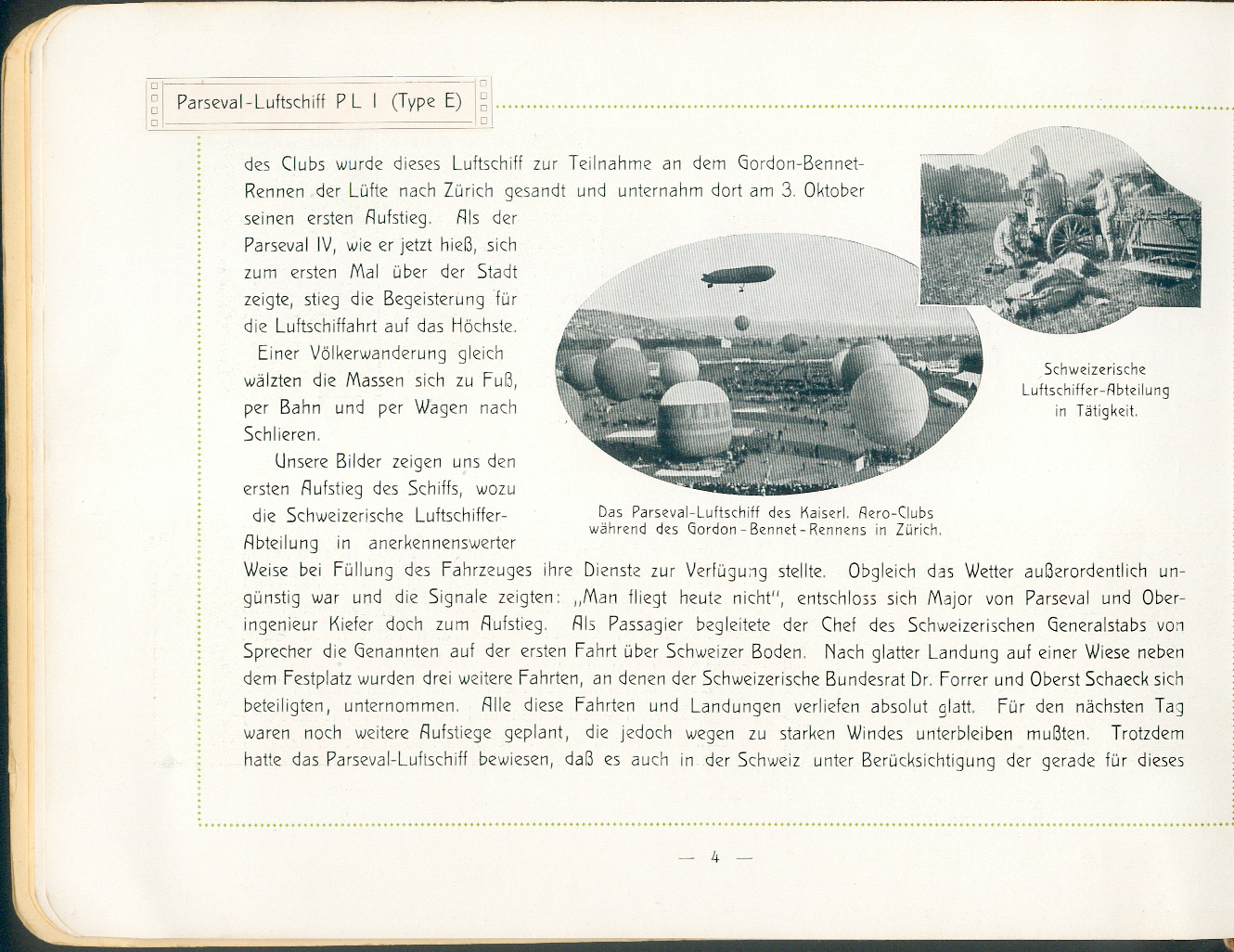
PL 1 at the Gordon-Bennet-Races (a balloon race) in Zurich

- Developed from the Versuchluftschiff
- Maiden flight: 1909-09-21
- Volume: 3200 m³, 60 m length, 9.4 m Diameter
- Power plant: a 62 kW (85 PS) Daimler-Motor, a 4.25 m-prop
- On 21 and 22 September 1909 three test flights, improvements to steering and hull, afterwards transported by train Zug to Zürich for the Gordon Bennet Ballon-Races, four demonstration flights in Zürich. The Swiss airship department provided gas filling services, and the chief of the Swiss military general staff was among the passengers for the first flight over Swiss soil.
- In February 1910 was used as the "Kaiserliche Aero-Klub-Luftschiff" (Imperial air-club airship) and in Bitterfeld until its end of service
- 20 Flights between 21 September 1909 und 21 April 1910, the last flight a forced landing
- Experimented with an image projector (see also PL 6 where advertising images were projected on the hull)

== PL 2 / P.I ==
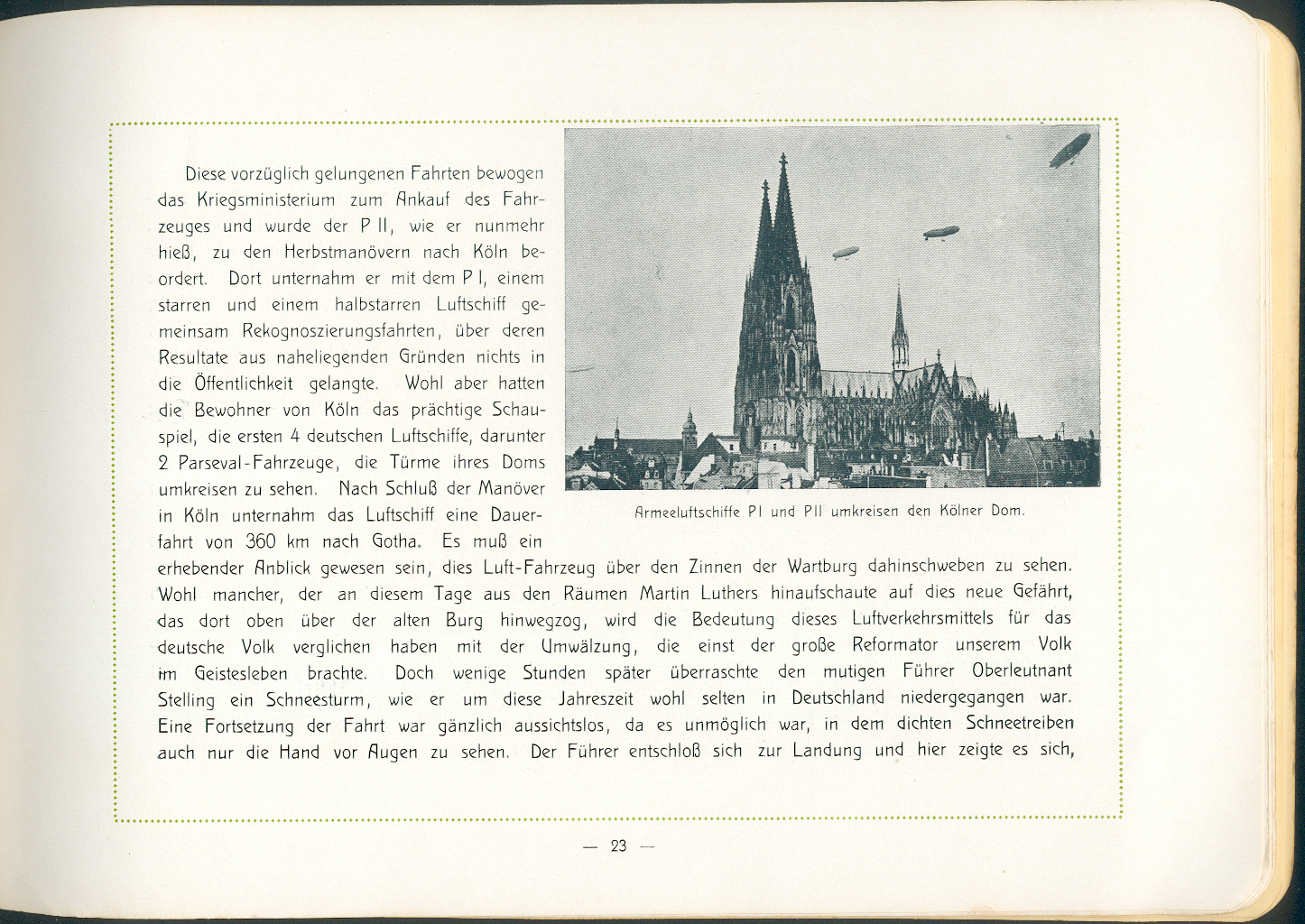
P I and P II over Cologne, together with two other German airships

- Built for the Prussian army, under the marking P.I, construction similar to the PL 1.
- Maiden flight: 1908-08-13, in service until 1912 then dismantled.
- Volume: 4000 m³
- Length: 60 m, Diameter: 10.4 m
- Power plant: a 62 kW (85 PS) Daimler-Motor with one airprop
- 45 km/h max speed

== PL 3 / P.II ==
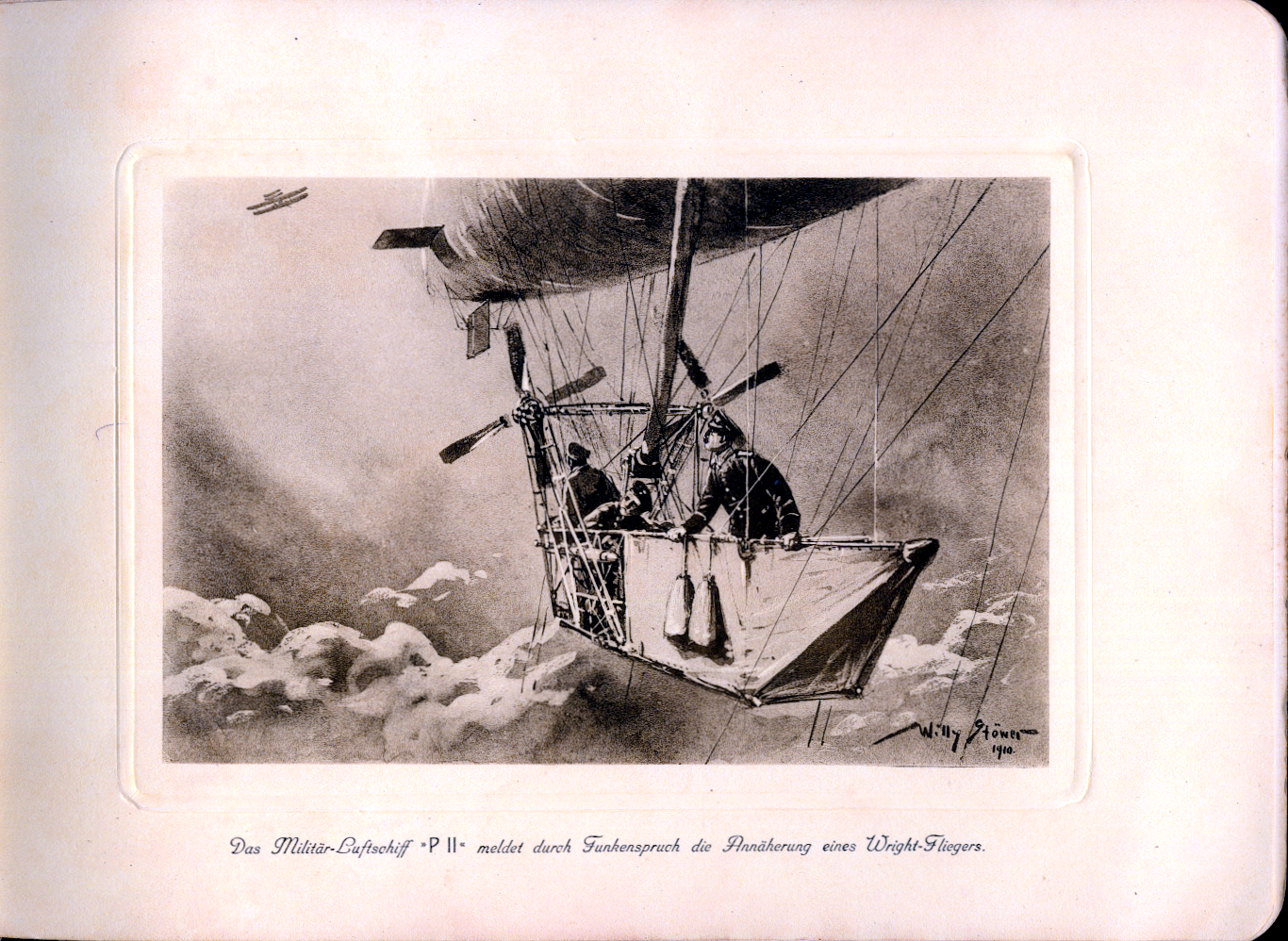
Willy Stöwer illustrated the military airship PII reporting the approach of a Wright Flyer in 1910.

- After seven flights, the hull volume was enlarged on 1909-03-23 from 5600 to 6600m³, refilling starts 1909-06-05, length remains at 70 m, diameter increased by one metre to 11.3 m, test flight 1909-06-28 in Bitterfeld
- Regular passenger flights with up to seven passengers and 4 crew from the International air exhibition in Frankfurt/Main from 7 August until the end of October 1909. Total 74 flights.
- Put out of service after flying into the sea on 1910-05-16
- Power plant: two 81 kW (110 PS) N.A.G.-Motors, each driving a four-bladed airprop
- max speed: 51 km/h

== PL 4 - M I ==
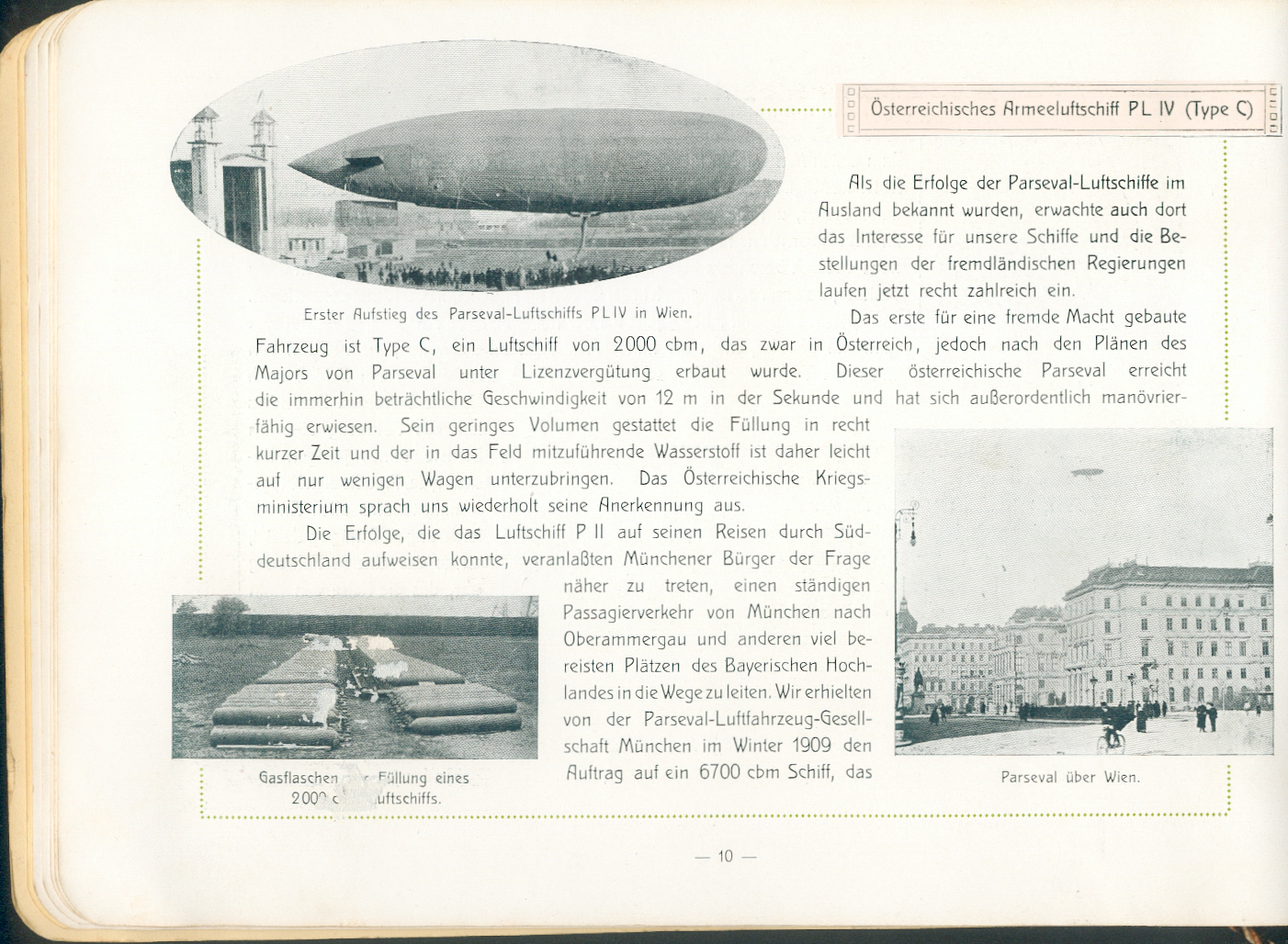
PL IV in Vienna

- PL 4 was purchased by the Kaiserlich und königlich Military-aero-nautical institute and stationed in Fischamend, Wien-Umgebung under the designation "M I"
- Maiden flight: 26. November 1909
- Volume: 2300 m³,
- Power plant: Austro-Daimler-Motors from Wiener Neustadt, either 1x 62 kW or 2x 33 kW (1x 85 or 2x 45 PS), each of which driving a single airprop
- Hull built by an Austrian rubber factory in Wimpassing im Schwarzatale
- Length: 50 m, Diameter 12.5 m,
- Flying ceiling: 1000 metre
- Crew: 2-3, passengers: 4-5 (capacity for 7 persons in total)

== PL 5 ==
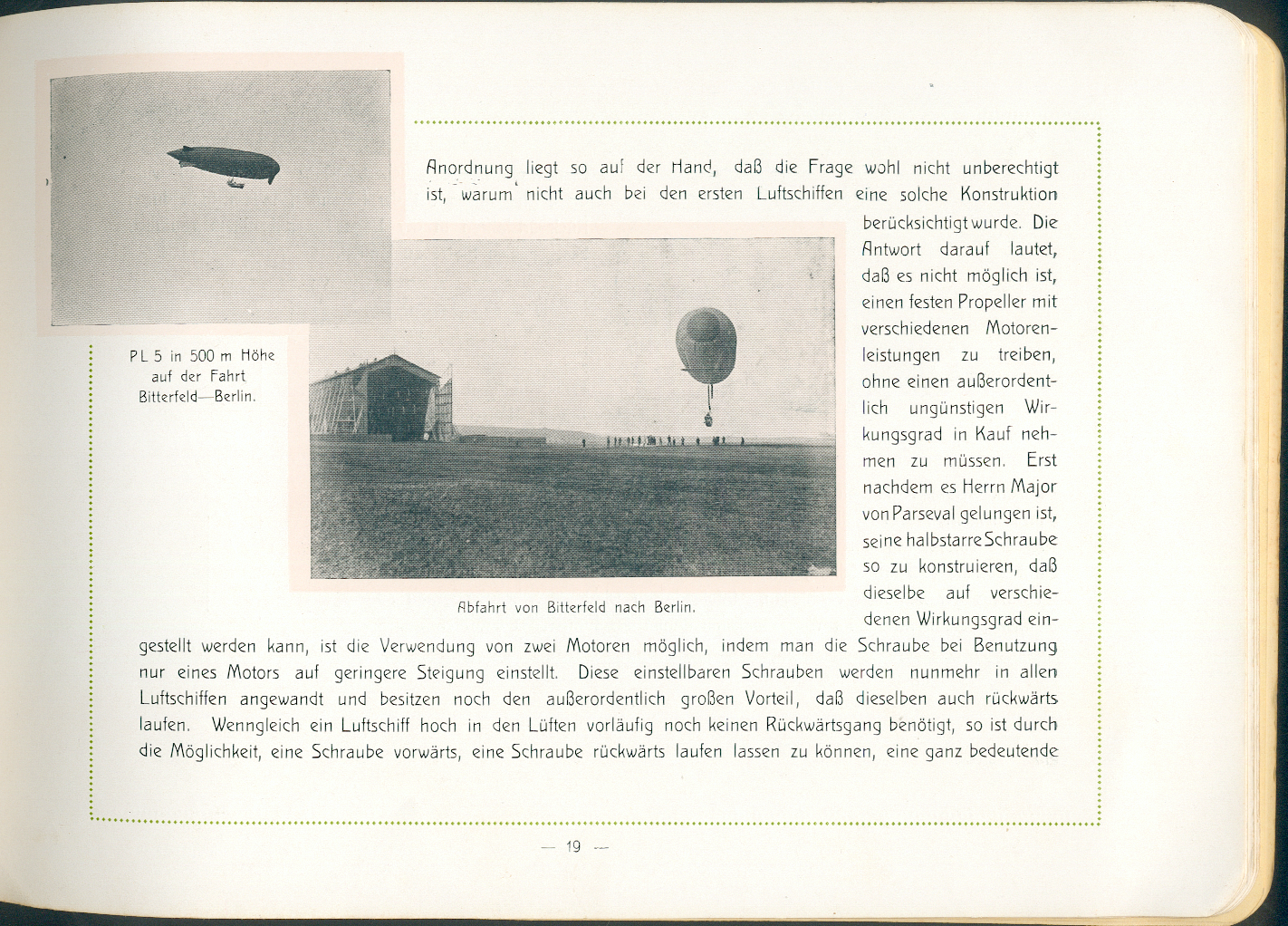
PL 5

- Over 150 passenger flights
- Stationed at Flughafen Klein Gandau in Breslau (Wroclaw, Poland)
- On 1911-06-11 destroyed in a fire while emptying the gas hull in Münden, later replaced by PL 9
- Volume 1350 m³
- Max speed: 12 metres per second (43 km/h)
- Flight duration 5 hours
- Flying ceiling: 1,000 metres
- Crew and passengers: 3 to 4

== PL 6 ==
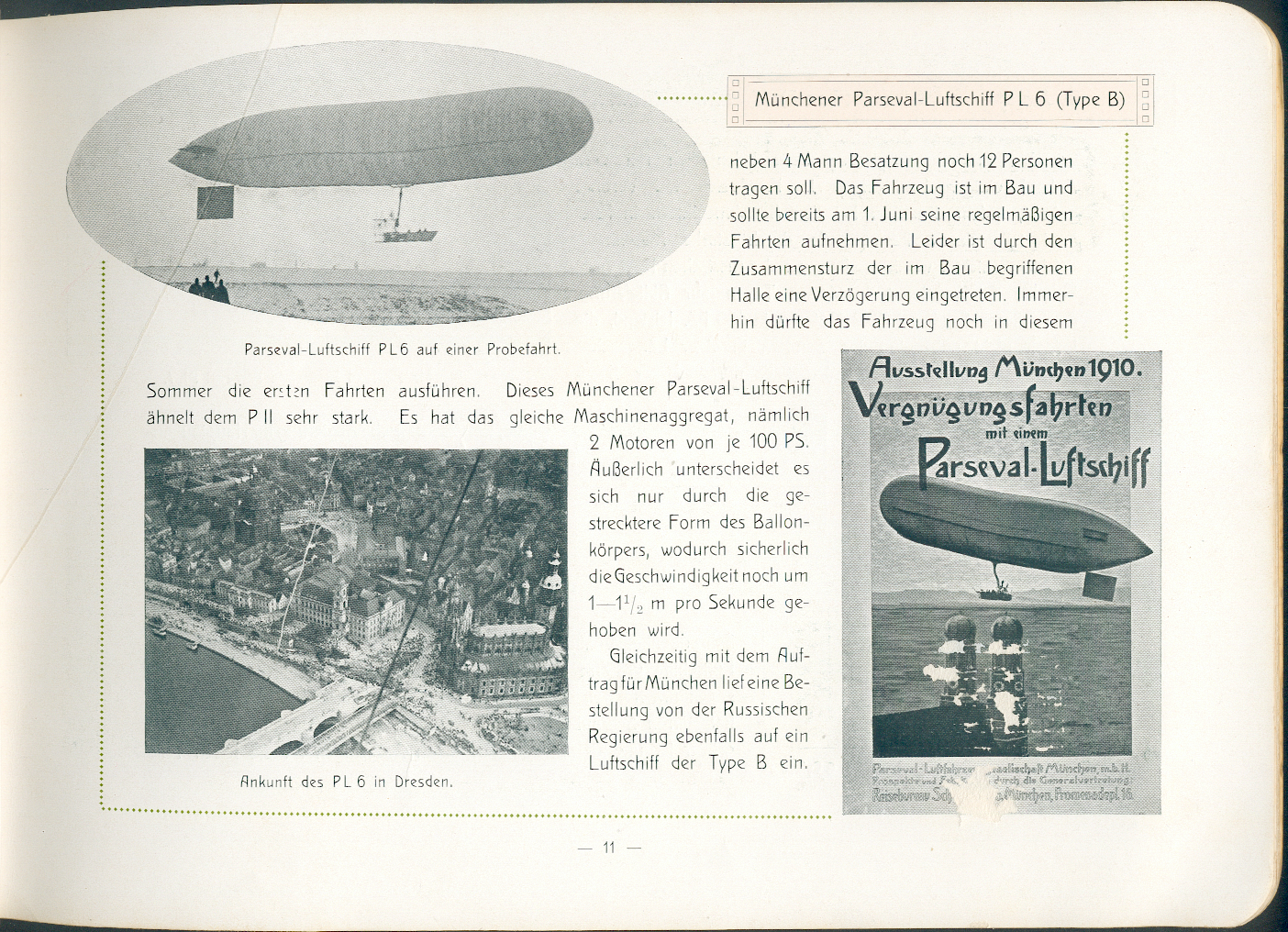
PL 6 over Dresden and at the Munich 1910 exhibition

- Maiden flight 1910-06-30,
- Intended for round trips
- Up to 12 passengers, 4 crew,
- First use of night air advertising on an airship, a projector could project images on its hull
- Modernised in 1912 to bring it to same technical standard as the PL 12, volume increased from 6800 to 8000 m³

== PL 7 Grif ==
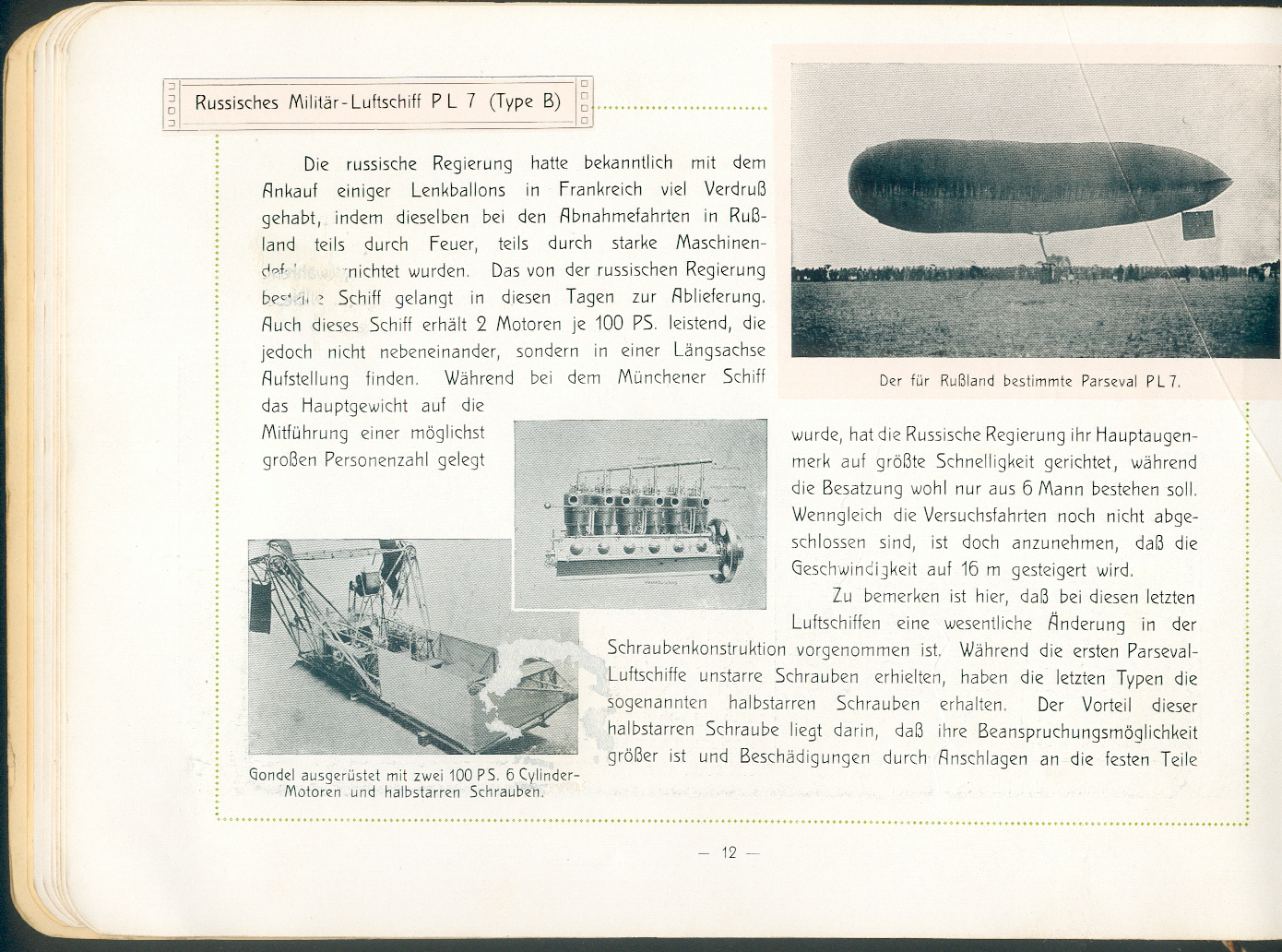
PL 7 displayed in the Luftfahrzeug-GmbH brochure

- Delivered to Russia with the marking Grif (Griffin), see also Russian airships
- Volume: 6700 m³
- Length 72 m, diameter 14 m
- Max speed: 14 metres per second (50 km/h), possibly 16 metres per second (58 km/h) with only 6 persons
- Flight duration: 20 hours or longer
- Flight ceiling: 2500 metre
- Crew and passengers: 12-16
- Crew: 3-4
- The Luft-Fahrzeug-Gesellschaft brochure shows the PL 7 (Type B), intended for the Russian military, one of its six-cylinder 100 PS engines, and its gondola with two engines driving semi-rigid props

== PL 8 Ersatz P.II ==
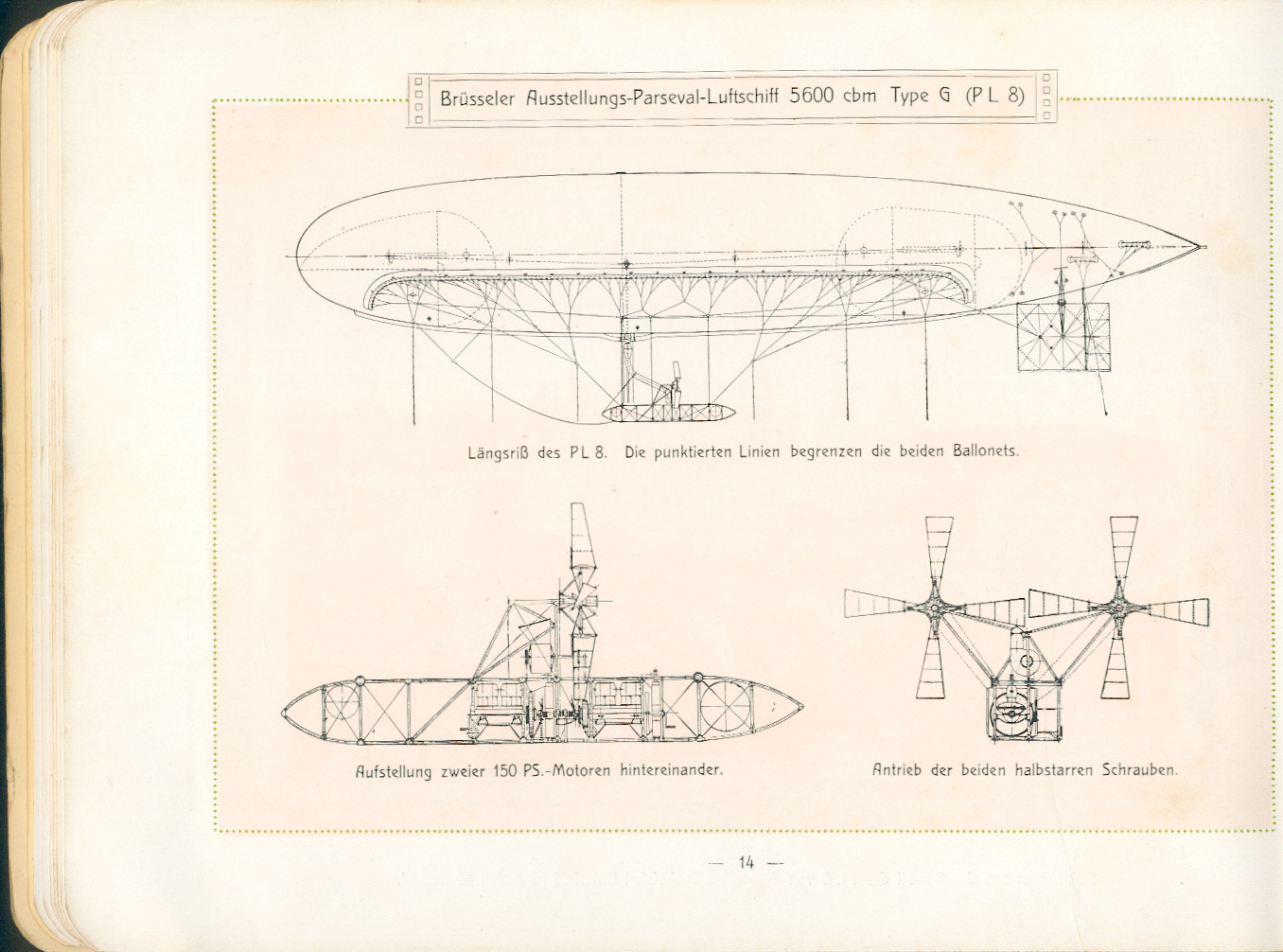
PL 8 diagram

- PL 8 delivered to Prussian army on 1913-03-12, with marking Ersatz P.II (P.II replacement)
- Volume: 5600 m³
- Max speed: 16–17 m/s
- Flight duration: >= 20 h
- Flight ceiling: 2000 m
- Passengers and crew: 7-12
- Crew: 4
- Power plant: Two 150 PS engines each driving a four-bladed airprop

== PL 9 ==
See: Parseval PL 9

- Stationed at Flughafen Klein Gandau in Breslau (Wroclaw, Poland)
- 1913 sold to the Turkish military
- First flight in Yeşilköy occurred on 23 July 1913.

== PL 10 Sportsluftschiff ==
- PL 10 1700 m³ Sportsluftschiff after the first flight in 1910 dismantled and stored in Bitterfeld

== PL 11 - P.III ==
- PL 11 first flight 1912-03-01, for the Prussian Army designated as P.III until middle 1914

== PL 12 Charlotte ==
- Built for the "Rheinisch-Westfälischen Flug- und Sportplatz-Gesellschaft mbH Wanne - Herten", where it was used for round trips
- Maiden flight: 1912-05-11
- PL 12 was used as a passenger and advertising airship until 1914.
- Length 82 m, diameter 14 m
- Power plant: 2x 81 kW (110 PS) NAG-engines
- Volume: 8000 m³
- Max speed: 48 km/h

== PL 13 Yuhi ==
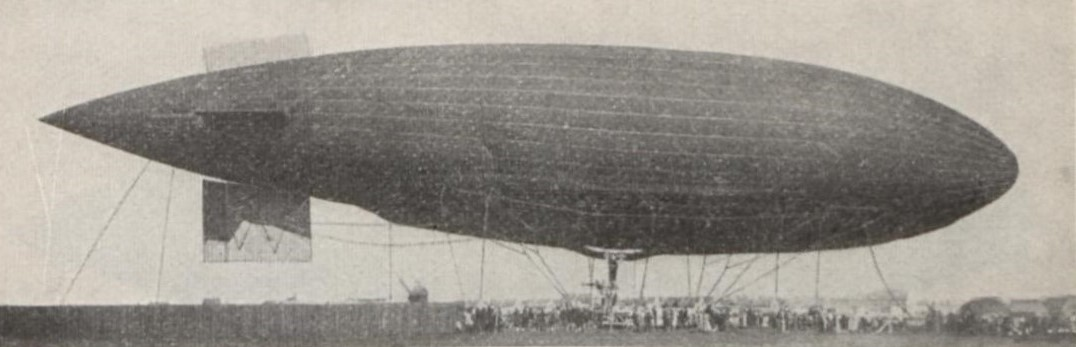
Parseval PL 13 Yuhi

See: Parseval PL 13

- 1912 delivered as Yuhi(雄飛号) to Japan. In 1916 January 22 Yuhi took the first, over 11 hours long, flight from Tokorozawa to Osaka.

Since then January 22 is the memorial day of "skyship" in Japan.

== PL 14 Burewestnik ==
- Delivered as Burewestnik to Russia

== PL 15 - M 3 ==
- 1914 delivered as "M 3" to Italy

== PL 16 - P.IV ==
- Maiden flight: 1913-10-02
- Middle of 1914 delivered to the Prussian army, where it was renamed "P.IV"
- In service until 1916-03-24

== PL 17 ==
- Maiden flight: 1912-12-30
- Delivered to Italy where it served in the army until 1915

== PL 18 - No.4 ==
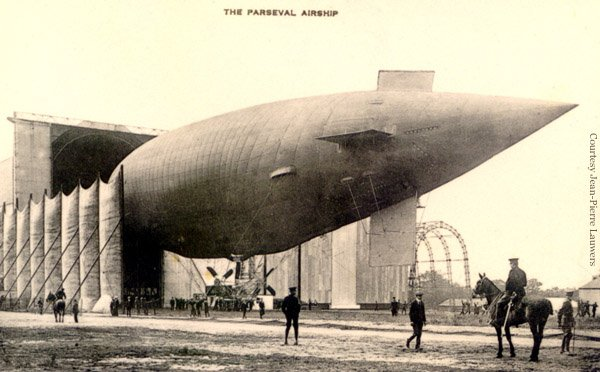
PL 18 in 1913

- Maiden flight: 23. April 1913
- 1913 delivered to the Royal Navy, under the marking "Parseval No.4". The British would describe its service as very successful
- Length: 80 m; diameter: 15 m; volume: 8800 m³.
- Power plant: 2x 132 kW (180 PS) Maybach-engines, max speed 68 km/h,
- Crew: 2 officers and 7 men. Radio and Weaponry installed
- Served during the World War I as patrol ship, demobilised in July 1917

== PL 19 ==
- PL 19 was intended for the British Royal Navy as "Parseval No.5", but upon war's outbreak was used instead by the German Navy. In England Vickers constructed three replacement hulls and 2 gondolas with identical specifications.
- Maiden flight: 30 August 1914
- Length: 92 m; Diameter: 15 m; Volume: 10,000 m³
- Power plant: two 132 kW (180 PS) Maybach-engines, max speed: 76 km/h,
- On 1915-01-25 after an air attack on Liepāja, Latvia, due to artillery damage made emergency sea-landing and crew taken as Russian prisoners of war https://btgv.ru/history/troops-history/german-block/the-presumptuous-parsefal/

== PL 20 - PL 24 ==
PL 20-24 were not built.

== PL 25 ==
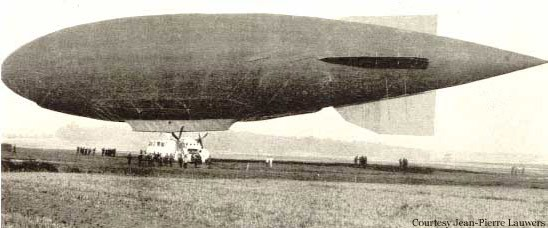
PL25

See: Parseval PL25 PL 25 was a military airship made in 1914/1915. It was the last single-gondola Parseval airship. It made its first flight on 1915-02-25, entered Navy service until 1916, after 95 flights.

== PL 26 ==
PL 26 was a semirigid airship whose maiden flight was on 1915-10-26, but it had an accident upon landing and was destroyed in a fire, with no casualties.

- Length: 157 m, maximum diameter: 19.5 m
- Volume: 31,300 m³
- Max speed: 100 km/h
- Power plant: four 177 kW (240 PS) Maybach-engines

== PL 27 ==
PL27's maiden flight was on 1917-03-08. The major difference from its predecessor PL 26 was the specification of the gondola. Because it no longer met increased military requirements, it was not put to military service but instead converted to a passenger airship in 1919. The Treaty of Versailles resulted in its dismantlement in 1920.

- Length: 157 m, maximum diameter: 19.5 m
- Volume: 31,300 m³
- Maximum speed: 100 km/h
- Power plant: four 177 kW (240 PS) Maybach-engines
- Lifting capacity 18 tonne

== Parseval-Naatz PN 28 ==
- Semirigid airship
- Trumpf-advertising airship, (like the Raab-Katzenstein RK 27)
- Built in Seddin/Pommern by the Berlin "Wasser- und Luftfahrzeug GmbH"
- Maiden flighton 1929-06-06 in Berlin
- Official marking: D-PN28
- Volume: 1800 m³

== Parseval-Naatz PN 29 Sidenhuset ==
- Semirigid airship
- Built in 1929 as D-PN 29 with a passenger capacity of 5
- Volume: 2300 m³
- Length: 44 m, diameter: 10 m
- Power plant: one Siemens-Halske-engine of 75 kW (100 PS)
- Max speed 82 km/h
- Total flying time: about 600 hours in 200 flights

On 1930-05-21 PN 29 acquired the Swedish call-sign "SE-ACG Sidenhuset", after the then well-known ladies boutique from Stockholm. The word "Sidenhuset" was displayed in large letters on its hull. The owner was "AB Luftskeppsreklam i Stockholm" (Airship Advertising Co).

Sidenhuset's task was to make advertising flights over the 1930 Stockholm Exhibition (Stockholmsutställningen). The airship was damaged by wind due to its being parked outside. The manufacturer arrived and it was decided to fly the ship back to Germany for repairs. During the fight it crashed into the Baltic Sea, south of the island of Öland, on 1930-06-04. The airship sank, but with no casualties.

== Parseval - Naatz PN 30 Odol ==
PN 30 flew under the callsign Odol as an advertising and research airship.

- Callsign: D-PN 30
- Length: 46 m
- Maximum diameter: 10.8 m
- Volume: 2600 m³
- Maximum speed: 80 km/h
- Power plant: 160 PS Siemens and Halske
- Maiden flight: July 1932

== See also ==
- List of Zeppelins
- List of Schütte-Lanz airships

== Bibliography ==
- Schmitt, G. und Schwipps, W. - Pioniere der frühen Luftfahrt, Gondrom Verlag, Blindlach 1995, ISBN 3-8112-1189-7
- Haaland, D.; Knäusel, H.G.; Schmidt, G. und Seifert, J. - Leichter als Luft - Ballone und Luftschiffe, Die Deutsche Luftfahrt Bd. 26, Bernard & Graefe Verlag, Bonn 1997, ISBN 3-7637-6114-4
- Reid, A. - The Parseval Airships, Lulu online publishing, 2015.
- Seifert, Dr. Jürgen - Die Luftschiffwerft und die Abteilung Seeflugzeugbau der Luft-Fahrzeug-Gesellschaft in Bitterfeld (1908 - 1920) Bitterfeld 1988, ISBN (none)
- Squier, George Owen (1908). "The Present Status of Military Aeronautics. I. Aerostation. Successful Military Dirigible Balloons. Germany. The Parseval". Annual Report of the Board of Regents of the Smithsonian Institution: 128–130.
- Luftschiffahrt, Dem heutigen Stande der Wissenschaft entsprechend dargestellt von Regierungsbaumeister K. Hackstetter, Oberingenieur Siegfried Hartmann, Regierungsrat Hofmann, Leutnant Ernst Mickel, Emil Sandt, Oberleutnant a. D. Stelling, Dr.P. Schulze, und Graf Ferdinand von Zeppelin, 1908
